= Crimp (joining) =

Joining two materials by deforming one or both to hold the other

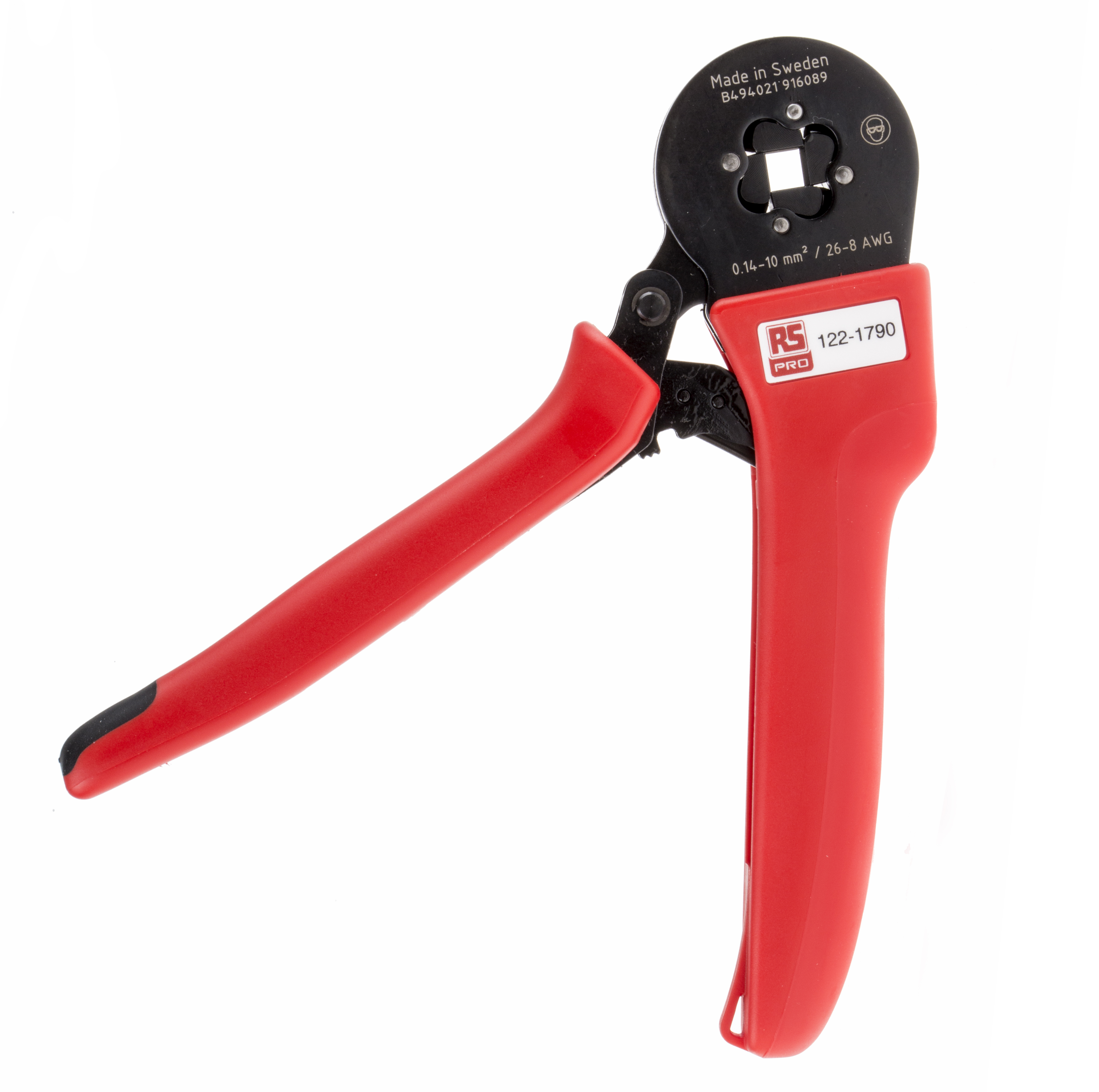
Crimp tool for 0.14 mm^{2} to 10 mm^{2} (26–8 AWG) insulated and non-insulated ferrules

Crimping is a method of joining two or more pieces of material by deforming one or both of them to hold the other. The bend or deformity is called the crimp. Crimping tools are used to create crimps in metal or other ductile materials.

Crimping is used extensively in metalworking, including to contain bullets in cartridge cases, for electrical connections, and for securing lids on metal food cans. Because it can be a cold-working technique, crimping can also be used to form a strong bond between the workpiece and a non-metallic component.

Crimping is also used to connect two pieces of dough used for food, such as in a piecrust.

== Tools ==
A crimping tool or crimp tool is used to create crimps. Crimping tools range in size from small handheld devices, to benchtop machines used for industrial purposes, to large fully-automatic wire processing machines for high-volume production.

For electrical crimps, a wide variety of crimping tools exist, and they are generally designed for a specific type and size of terminal. Handheld tools (sometimes called crimping pliers) are common. These often use a ratcheting mechanism to ensure sufficient crimping force has been applied. Apart from handheld tools, crimping tools can also include sophisticated electrically powered hydraulic types and battery operated tools that cover the entire size range and type of conductors, designed for mass production operations.

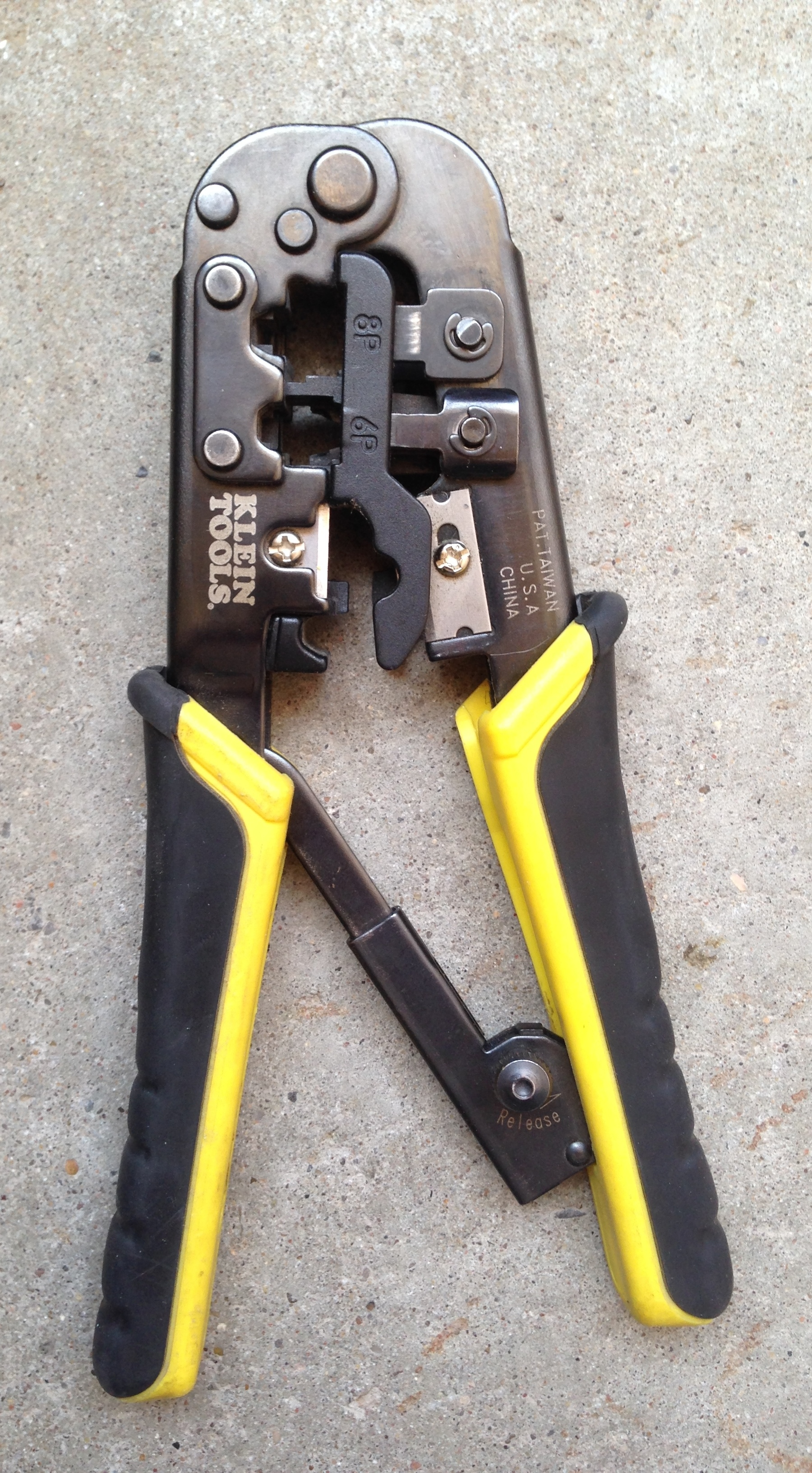
Klein modular connector crimpers

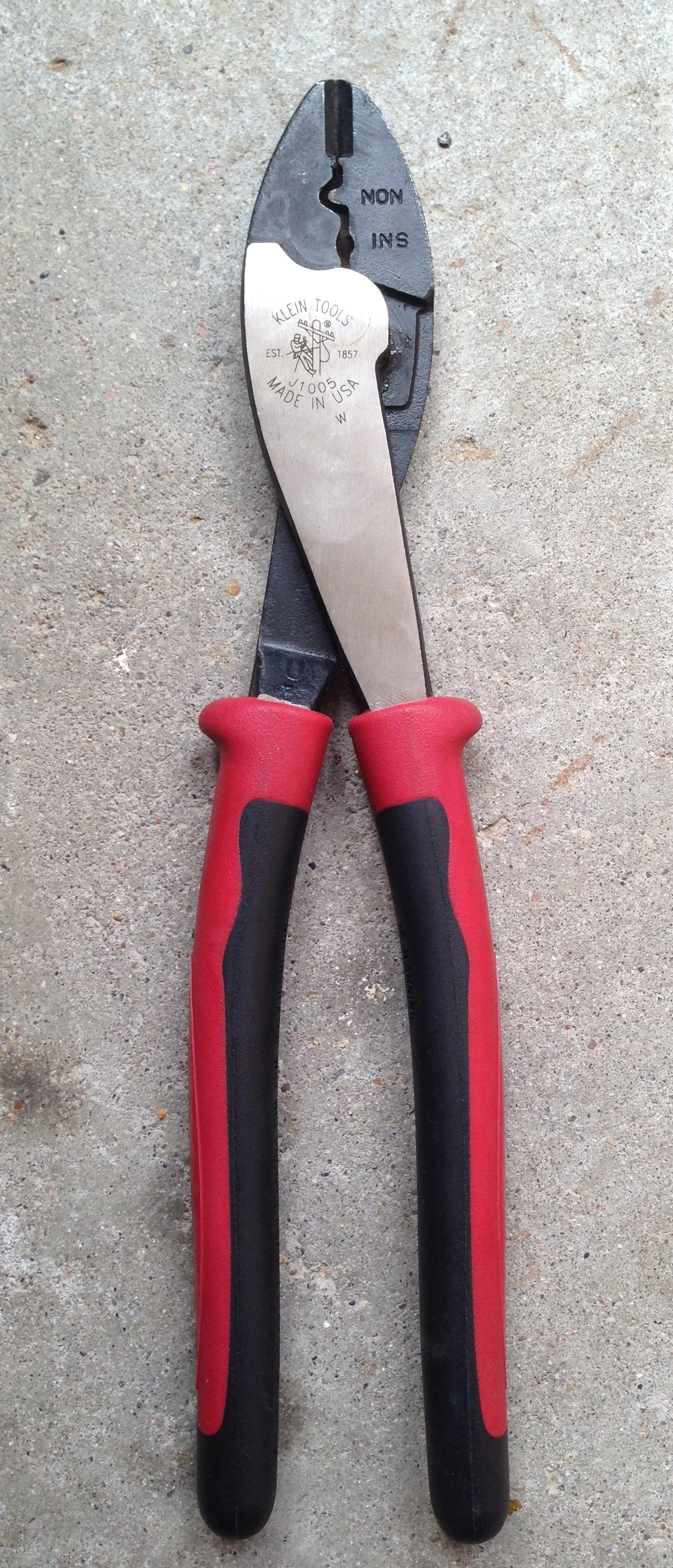
Klein Journeyman crimpers

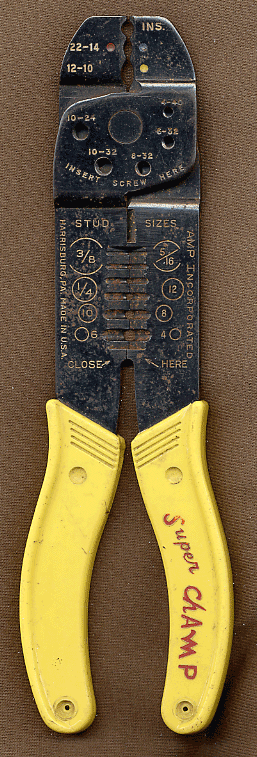
Crimping pliers, which can also strip and cut wire

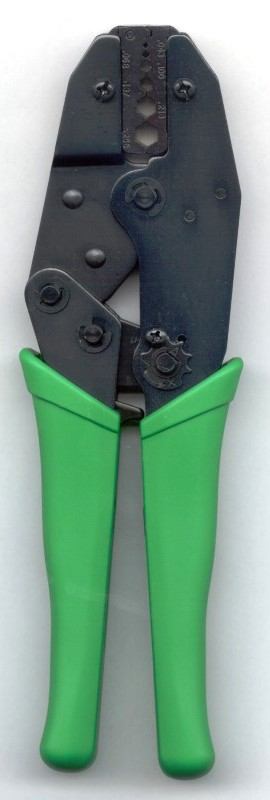
Crimping tool for F connectors and other hexagonal connectors

== Electrical crimp ==
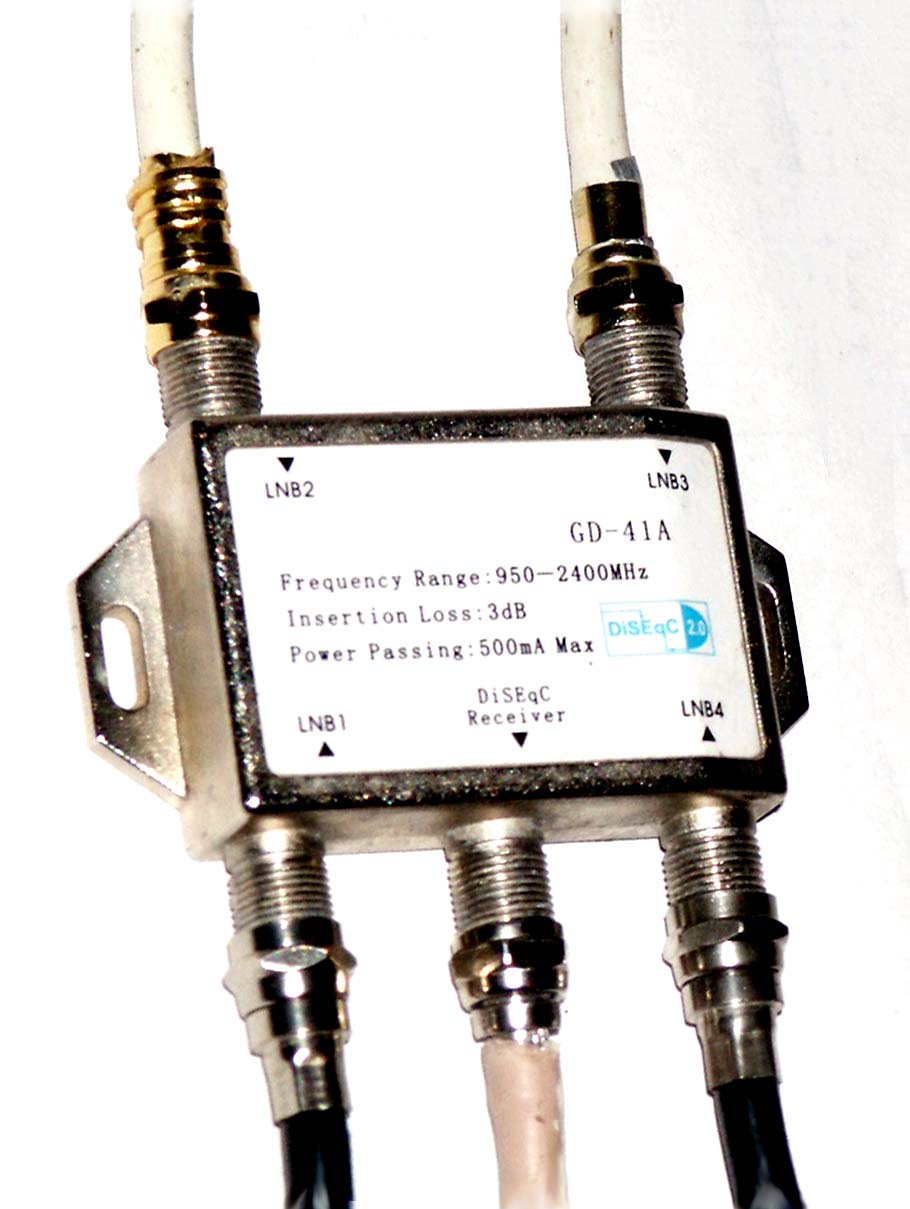
F connectors crimped on to coaxial cable. The bottom middle cable is missing its crimping collar.

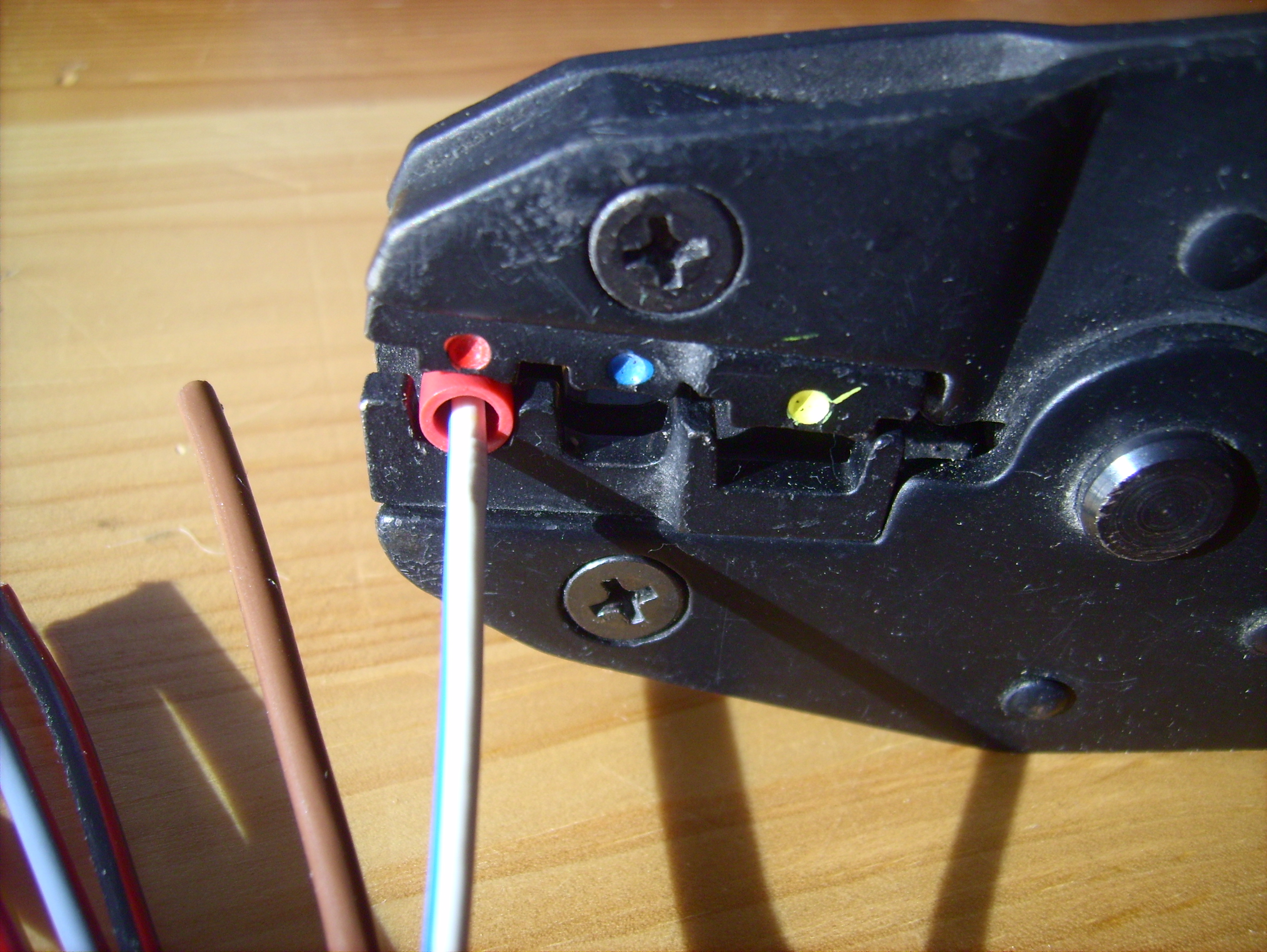
A wire and connector in a crimping tool

An electrical crimp is a type of solderless electrical connection which uses physical pressure to join the contacts. Crimp connectors are typically used to terminate stranded wire. Stripped wire is inserted through the correctly sized opening of the connector, and a crimper is used to tightly squeeze the opening against the wire. Depending on the type of connector used, it may be attached to a metal plate by a separate screw or bolt or it could be simply screwed on using the connector itself to make the attachment like an F connector.

=== Characteristics ===
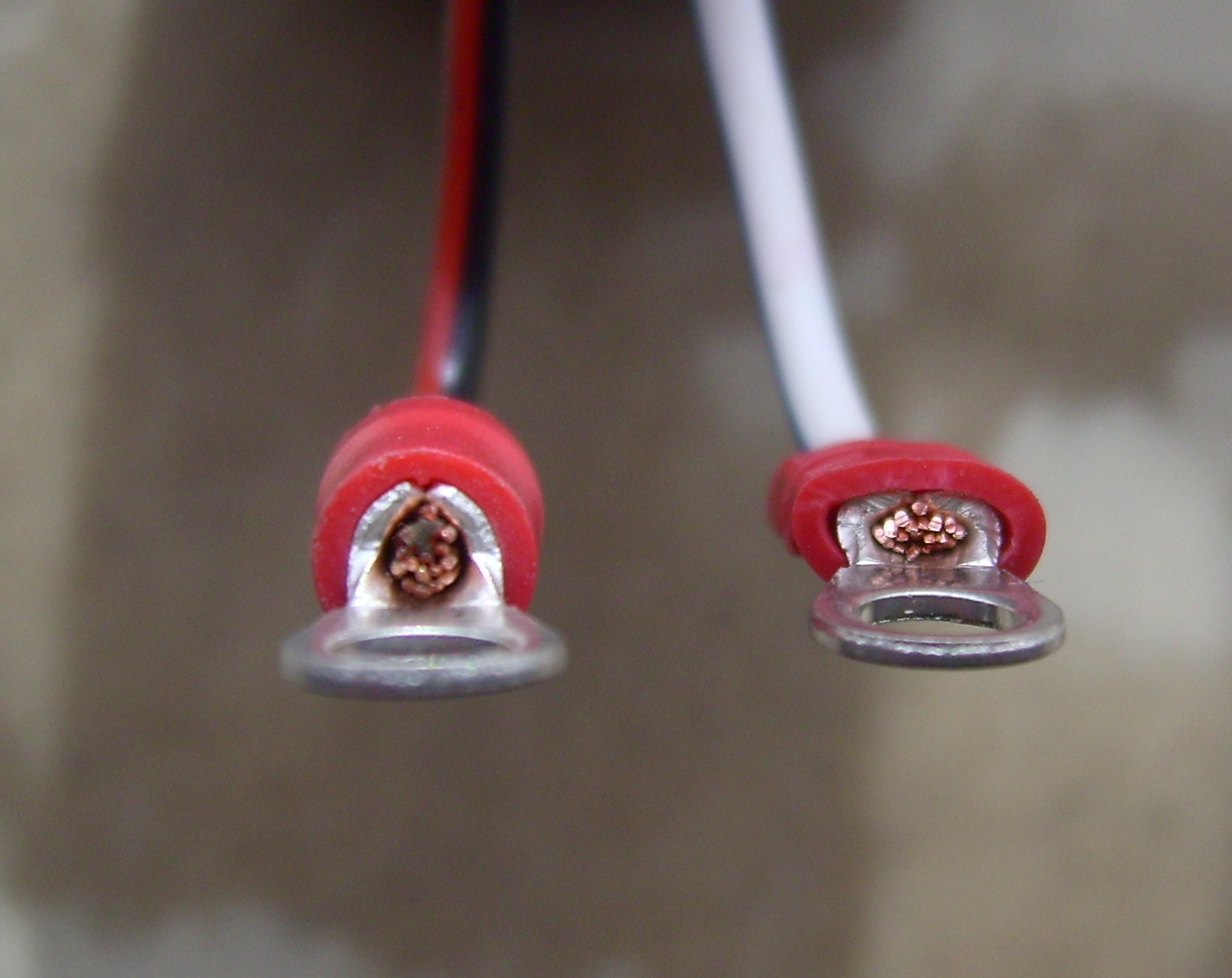
Close-up of two ring-tongue terminals before (left) and after (right) crimping

The benefits of crimping over soldering and wire wrapping include:

- A well-engineered and well-executed crimp is designed to be gas-tight, which prevents oxygen and moisture from reaching the metals (which are often different metals) and causing corrosion.
- Because no alloy is used (as in solder) the joint is mechanically stronger.
- Crimped connections can be used for cables of both small and large cross-sections, whereas only small cross-section wires can be used with wire wrapping.

Crimping is normally performed by first inserting the terminal into the crimp tool. The terminal must be placed into the appropriately sized crimp barrel. The wire is then inserted into the terminal with the end of the wire flush with the exit of the terminal to maximize cross-sectional contact. Finally, the handles of the crimp tool are used to compress and reshape the terminal until it is cold-welded onto the wire.

The resulting connection may appear loose at the edges of the terminal, but this is desirable so as to not have sharp edges that could cut the outer strands of the wire. If executed properly, the middle of the crimp will be swaged or cold-formed.

More specialized crimp connectors are also used, for example as signal connectors on coaxial cables in applications at high radio frequencies (VHF, UHF). These often require specialised crimping tools to form the proper crimp.

Crimped contacts are permanent (i.e. the connectors and wire ends cannot be reused).

=== Theory ===
Crimp-on connectors are attached by inserting the stripped end of a stranded wire into a portion of the connector, which is then mechanically deformed by compressing (crimping) it tightly around the wire. The crimping is usually accomplished with special crimping tool such as crimping pliers. A key idea behind crimped connectors is that the finished connection should be gas-tight.

Effective crimp connections deform the metal of the connector past its yield point so that the compressed wire causes tension in the surrounding connector, and these forces counter each other to create a high degree of static friction which holds the cable in place. Due to the elastic nature of the metal in crimped connections, they are highly resistant to vibration and thermal shock.

Two main classes of wire crimps exist:

- Closed barrel crimps have a cylindrical opening for a wire, and the crimping tool deforms the originally circular cross section of the terminal into some other shape. This method of crimping is less resilient to vibration.
- Open barrel crimps have "ears" of metal that are shaped like a V or U, and the crimp terminal bends and folds them over the wire prior to swaging the wire to the terminal. Open-barrel terminals are claimed to be easier to automate because of avoiding the need to funnel stranded wire into the narrow opening of a barrel terminal.

In addition to their shape, crimped connectors can also be characterized by their insulation (insulated or non-insulated), and whether they crimp onto the conductor(s) of a wire (wire crimp) or its insulation (insulation crimp).

=== Shapes ===
- C crimp
- D crimp
- F crimp (a.k.a. B crimp)
- O crimp
- W crimp
- Overlap/OVL crimp
- Oval (confined) crimp
- Four-Mandrel crimp
- Mandrel (crescent) crimp
- Mandrel crimp-narrow (indented)
- Hexagonal crimp
- Mandrel (indent) crimp
- RJ45 crimp
- Square crimp
- Trapezoidal crimp
- Trapezoidal indent crimp
- Trapezoidal crimp front
- Tyco crimp
- Western crimp

=== Applications ===
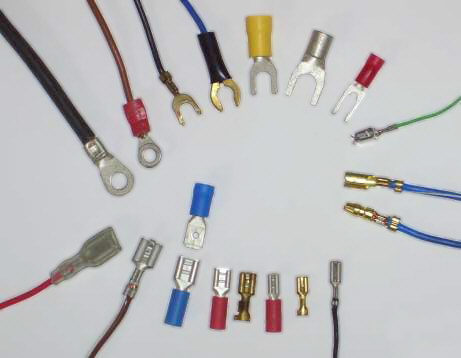
Blade connectors (bottom), ring and spade connectors (top), and bullet connectors (right)

Crimped connections are common alternatives to soldered connections. There are complex considerations for determining which method is appropriate – crimp connections are sometimes preferred for these reasons:

- Easier, cheaper, or faster to reproduce reliably in large-scale production
- Fewer dangerous or harmful processes involved in termination (soldered connections require aggressive cleaning, high heat, and possibly toxic solders)
- Potentially superior mechanical characteristics due to strain relief and lack of solder wicking

Crimped connectors fulfill numerous uses, including termination of wires to screw terminals, blade terminals, ring/spade terminals, wire splices, or various combinations of these. A tube-shaped connector with two crimps for splicing wires in-line is called a butt splice connector.

Single-wire crimp terminals include:

- Blade or quick disconnect (e.g., Faston or Lucar)
- Bullet (e.g. Shur-Plug)
- Butt splice
- Flag tongue
- Rectangular tongue
- Hook tongue
- Spade tongue (flanged, short spring, long spring)
- Ring tongue (slotted, offset)
- Multiple stud
- Packard 56
- Pin (SAE/J928)
- Wire pin

Crimping is also a common technique to join wires to a multipin connector, such as in Molex connectors or modular connectors.

Circular connectors using crimp contacts can be classified as rear release or front release, referring to the side of the connector where the pins are anchored:

- Front release contacts are released from the front (contact side) of the connector, and removed from the rear. The removal tool engages with the front portion of the contact and pushes it through to the back of the connector.
- Rear release contacts are released and removed from the rear (wire side) of the connector. The removal tool releases the contacts from the rear and pulls the contact out of the retainer.

Crimp connections are used typically to attach RF connectors, such as BNC connectors, to coaxial cables quickly, as an alternative to soldered connections. Typically the male connector is crimp-fitted to a cable, and the female attached, often using soldered connections, to a panel on equipment. A special power or manual tool is used to fit the connector. Wire strippers which strip outer jacket, shield braid, and inner insulation to the correct lengths in one operation are used to prepare the cable for crimping.

=== Quality ===
A crimped connection will only be reliable if a number of criteria are met:

- All strands have been deformed enough to cold-flow into the terminal body
- The compression force is not too light, nor too strong
- The connector body is not overly deformed
- Wires must be in solid working condition, cannot have scrapes, nicks, severing or other damages
- Insulation should not show any signs of pinching, pulling, fraying, discoloration, or charring
- Large voids are not left inside the crimp (caused by not enough wire inside the connector)
- The wire should have as many strands as possible, so that a few damaged or uninserted wires will not adversely affect the crimp density, and thus degrade the electrical and mechanical properties of the connection.

Micrographs of the crimped connections can be prepared to illustrate good and bad crimps for training and quality assurance purposes. The assembled connection is cut in cross-section, polished and washed in nitric acid to dissolve any copper dust that may be filling voids leading to a false indication of a good crimp.

=== Terminal insulation colors ===
Standard FASTON terminal colors
Insulation color	Wire gauge (AWG)	Comments
Yellow	26–22	
Transparent	24–20	
Red	22–18	
Blue	16–14	
Yellow/Black	16–14	Heavy duty
Yellow	12–10	
Red	8	
Blue	6	
Yellow	4	
Red	2	
Blue	1/0	
Yellow	2/0	
Red	3/0	
Blue	4/0	

== Other uses ==
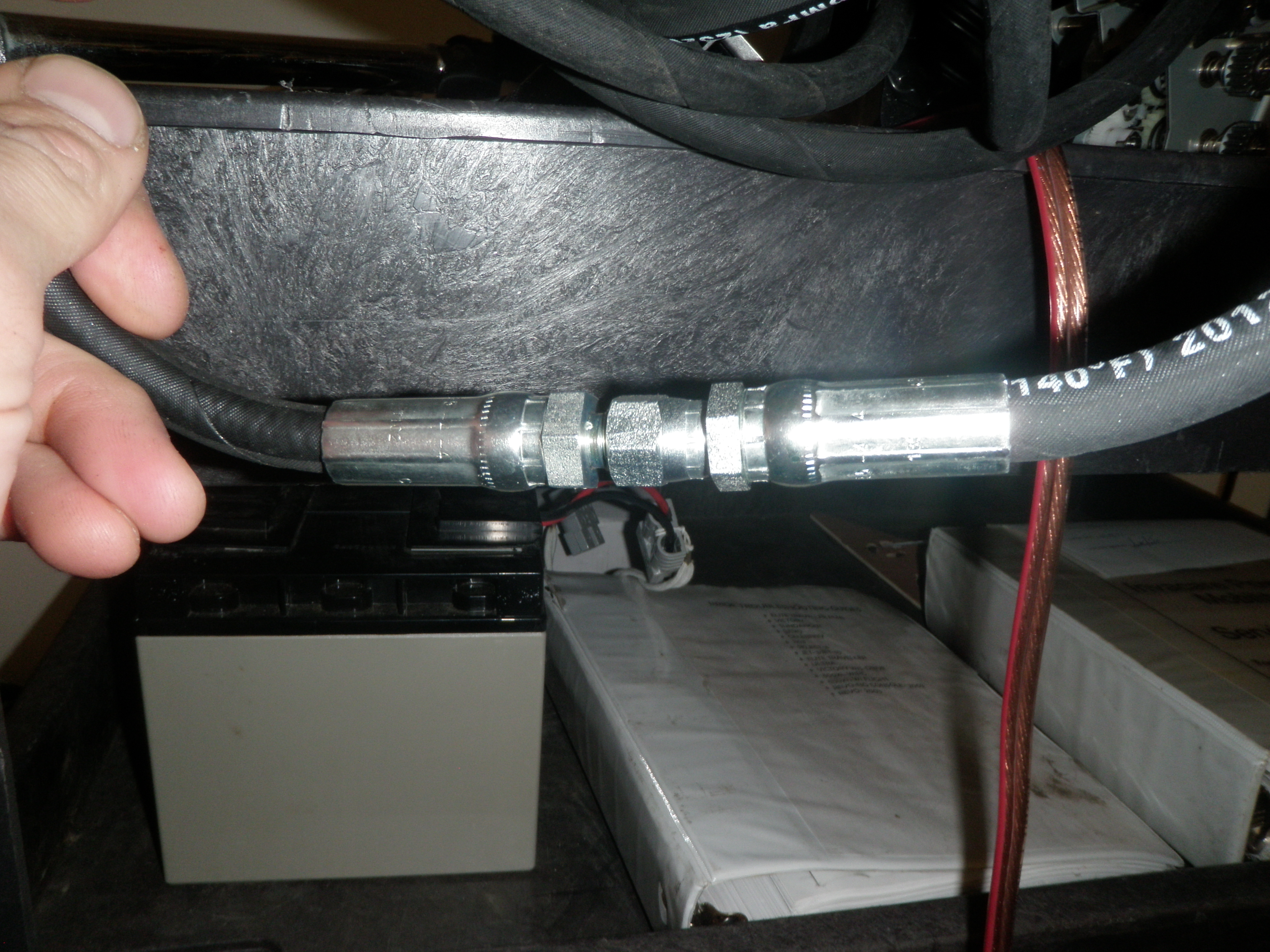
Crimped connectors on hydraulic hose

Crimping is most extensively used in metalworking. Crimping is commonly used to fix bullets in their cartridge cases, for rapid but lasting electrical connections, for securing lids on metal food cans, and for many other applications.

=== Jewelry ===
In jewelry manufacture, crimp beads, or crimp tubes, are used to make secure joints in fine wire, such as used in clasps or tie loops. A crimped lead (or other soft metal) seal is attached to secure wires used to secure fasteners in aircraft, or to provide visual evidence of tampering when securing a utility meter or as a seal on cargo containers.

=== Plumbing ===
In plumbing, there is a trend in some jurisdictions towards the use of crimped fittings to join metallic pipes, replacing the traditional soldering or "sweating" of joints. This trend is driven in part by increased restrictions or bans of processes involving open flames, which may now require costly special permits.

=== Sheet metal ===
When joining segments of tubular sheet metal pipe, such as for smoke pipes for wood stoves, downspouts for rain gutters, or for installation of ventilation ducting, one end of a tube is treated with a crimping tool to make a slip joint into the next section of duct. The joint will not be liquid-tight but will be adequate for conveying low pressure fluids. Crimp joints may be arranged to prevent accumulation of dirt.

=== Food ===
A pork pie with a crimped edge holding the top and sides together

Crimping is often used around the edges of pies and filled pasta like ravioli to seal the insides by connecting the top and bottom dough layers. This can be done with fingers, a fork, or a crimping tool. A jagging iron, also known as a crimping wheel, or jagger, consists of a handle and a wheel with a wavy pattern. There are also crimping tongs.

== History ==
The technique of soldering wires has remained common for at least a century, however crimp terminals came into use in the middle of the 20th century. In 1953, AMP Incorporated (now TE Connectivity) introduced crimp barrel terminals, and in 1957 Cannon Brothers experimented with machined contacts integrating crimp barrels. During the 1960s, several standards for crimp connectors were published, including MS3191-1, MS3191-4 and MIL-T-22520. In 2010, the predominant standard for crimp connectors changed to MIL-DTL-22520.

== See also ==
- Pliers
