= SK Hand Tools =

American tool manufacturer

SK Hand Tools Corporation
- Company type: Subsidiary of Hangzhou GreatStar Industrial
- Industry: Manufacturing
- Founded: Chicago, IL (1900s)
- Headquarters: Sycamore, IL
- Products: Professional hand tools
- Website: www.sktools.com

SK Hand Tools (styled earlier as S-K, now usually SK) is an American tool company located in Sycamore, Illinois, with additional manufacturing facilities in China, Taiwan and the US. Outlets for their products include independent tool-truck dealers, auto parts stores, and major internet vendors such as Sears and Amazon.com. The company has a tool line of over 3,500 items including wrenches, ratchets, screwdrivers, tool boxes and air tools. In 2021, SK was acquired by Hangzhou GreatStar Industrial.

Jay Leno described the company as "an iconic American brand for decades," and the company is known for inventing the round-head ratchet wrench.

== History ==
SK was founded as the Sherman-Klove Company, specializing in screw machine products, by Mason H. Sherman and Noah Grover Klove. The company was founded in the early 20th century to supply munitions in World War I, and made mortar housings in a screw machine plant on Harrison Street in Chicago. During the 1920s SK operated primarily as a contract company, making tools for other brands (including Craftsman). Business thrived, they made specialty screw machine products that did well until the Depression. William S. Sherman (W.S.), Mason's son, came to SK after graduating college in 1927 and was eventually a major owner of the company. One of the products the company made was socket wrenches for Hinsdale Socket and Wrench Company. The Hinsdale Company went out of business during the great depression leaving Sherman-Klove with a large inventory of this product. They then redesigned the product and changed the company name to S-K Tools.

Theodore Rueb, an engineer for the Sherman-Klove Company, went on to develop a new mechanism for a very successful line of ratchets, scaled from 1/4-inch drive up to 3/4-inch drive. The "round-head" ratchet has remained one of the most popular ratchet styles in the nearly nine decades since S-K's first development, and many modern ratchets are little changed from the earliest design. SK invented the round-head ratchet wrench in 1933 and received a patent for it the following year, which remains a mainstay of their, and every major competitor's product line today.

=== Change of ownership ===
- In 1962, SK, along with manufacturing partner Lectrolite Corp., of Defiance, Ohio, was bought out by Symington-Wayne and became S-K Wayne.
- In 1968 S-K Wayne was purchased by Dresser Industries as part of the merger between Wayne Oil and Tank Company and Dresser Industries. Dresser Industries made many changes to S-K's tools including dropping the cross-hatch pattern from their sockets in order to "modernize" them.
- In 1985, SK became part of the French company Facom Tools.
- In 2005 it was purchased by its management and again operated independently as the S-K Hand Tools Corporation.
- On June 29, 2010, the company declared bankruptcy. On August 23, 2010, it was announced that two days later, on August 25, 2010, Ideal Industries would acquire SK.
- In July 2021 SK was acquired by Hangzhou GreatStar Industrial, a Chinese tool conglomerate company that is current owner of other American brands such as Shop-Vac, Arrow Fastener, and Pony Jorgensen clamps.

== Gallery ==
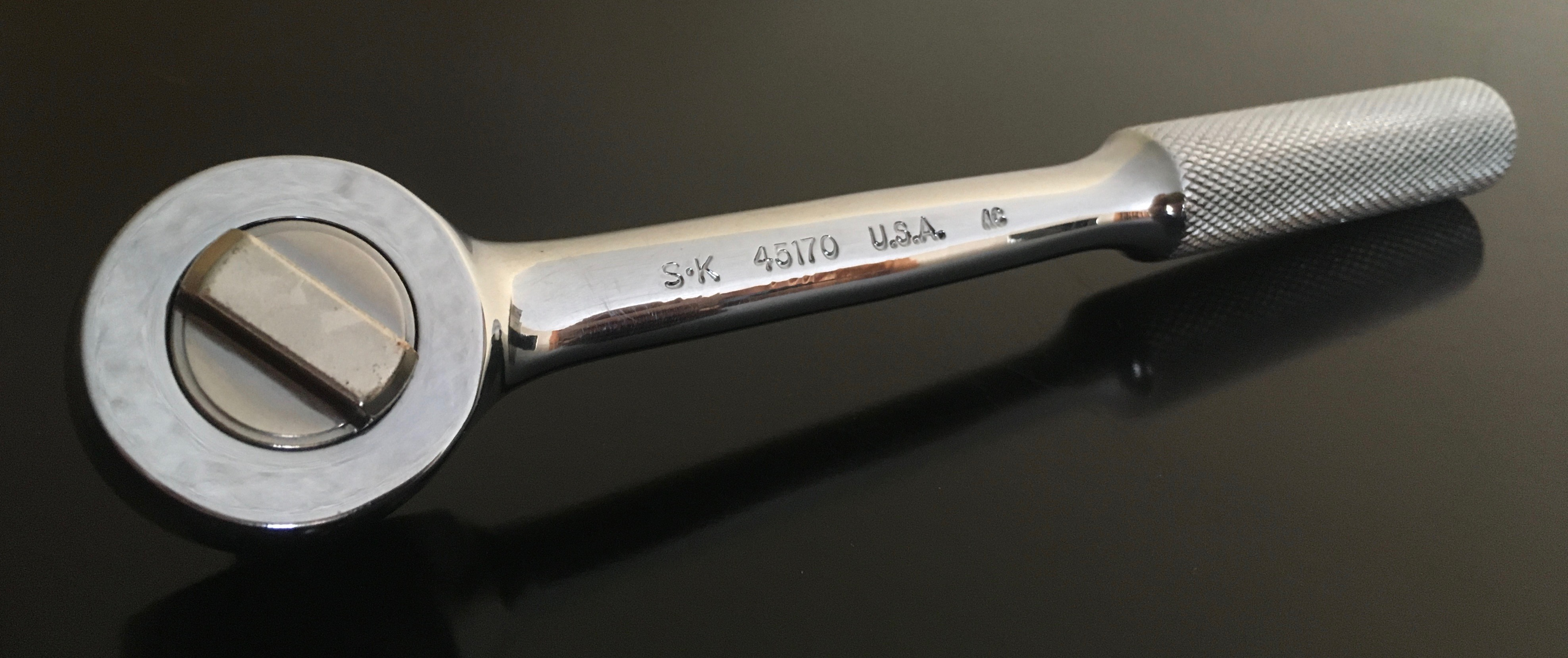
An SK roundhead ratchet

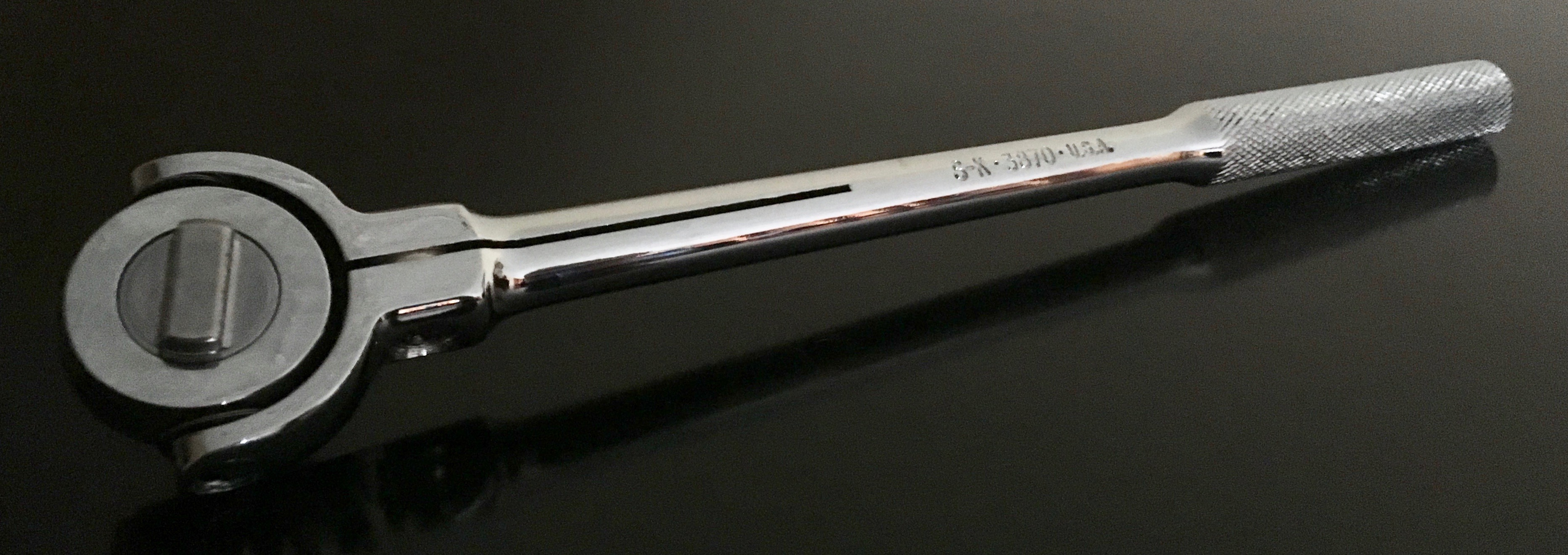
An SK roto-ratchet

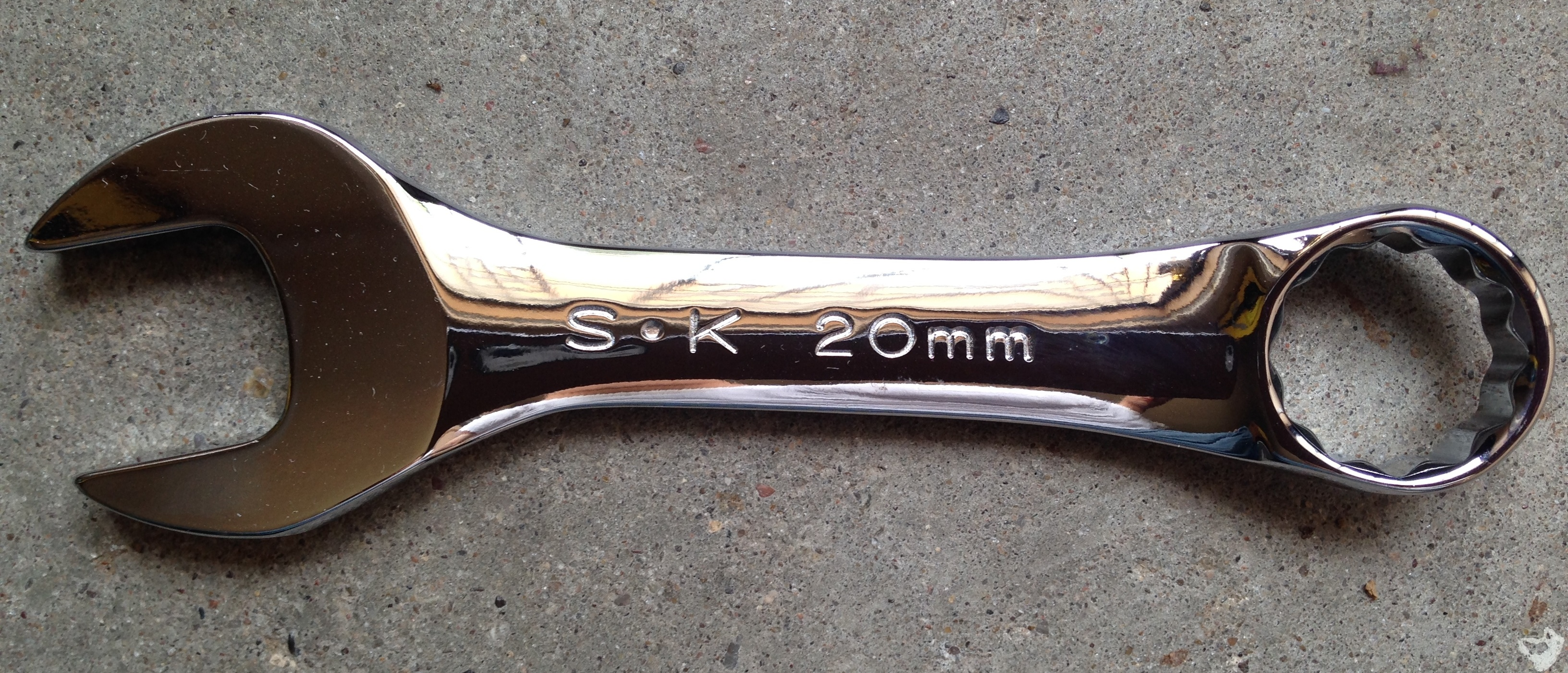
A short pattern combination wrench
