= Hangzhou GreatStar Industrial =

Chinese industrial conglomerate

- Type: Public
- Traded as: SSE: 002444
- Industry: Hand tools; Power tools
- Founded: 1993; 33 years ago
- Headquarters: Hangzhou, China
- Area served: Worldwide
- Parent: GreatStar Group
- Subsidiaries: GreatStar Tools USA
- Website: en.greatstartools.com

Hangzhou GreatStar Industrial Co., Ltd. (Chinese: 杭州巨星科技股份有限公司; pinyin: Hángzhōu Jùxīng Kējì Gǔfèn Yǒuxiàn Gōngsī) is an industrial conglomerate based in Hangzhou, China. It primarily produces hand tools and power tools.

Subsidiaries include Hangzhou Holdings and GreatStar Tools USA. The GreatStar Tools USA division president is Gary DuBoff.

== Brands ==
- Arrow Fastener (acquired 2019)
- DuraTech hand and power tools
- EverBrite personal lighting
- Goldblatt masonry tools (acquired 2010)
- LISTA warehouse equipment (acquired 2018)
- Millers Falls Company (acquired 2002)
- Pony Jorgensen hand tools (acquired 2016)
- Prime-Line window and door hardware (acquired 2019)
- SK Hand Tools (acquired 2021)
- Sheffield Tools (钢盾; gāngdùn; domestic market only)
- Shop-Vac wet/dry vacuum cleaners (acquired 2020)
- Swiss+Tech multi-tools
- WORKPRO hand and power tools (since 2002)
