= Shop-Vac =

American Vacuum Manufacturer

Shop-Vac Corporation
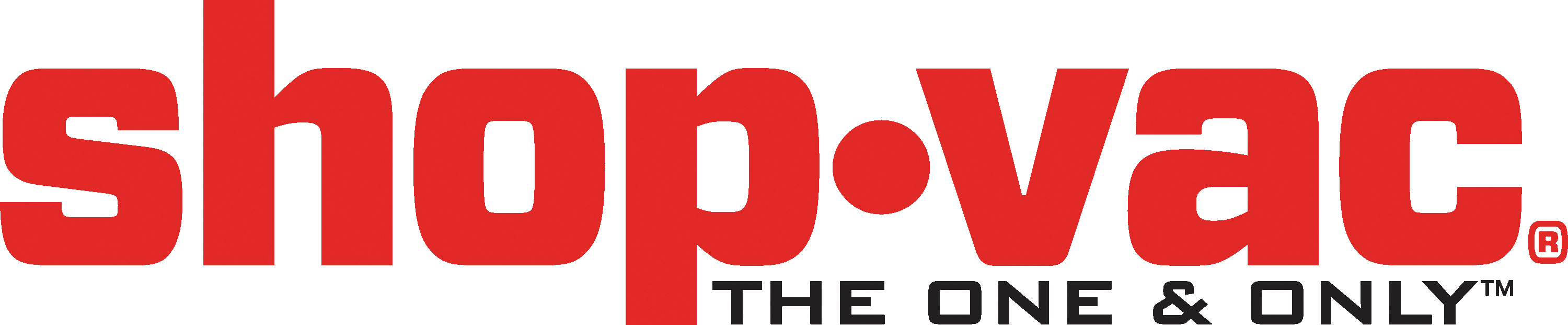
- Type: Subsidiary
- Founded: 1953; 73 years ago
- Founder: Martin Miller
- Headquarters: Williamsport, Pennsylvania
- Products: Vacuum cleaners and shop vacuums
- Owner: Hangzhou GreatStar Industrial
- Number of employees: 1,700
- Parent: GreatStar Tools USA
- Website: www.shopvac.com

Shop-Vac, also known as Shop-Vac Corporation, is an American wet/dry vacuum manufacturer headquartered in Williamsport, Pennsylvania. Shop-Vac was purchased by Hangzhou GreatStar Industrial and shares a facility with SK Hand Tools.

== History ==
Shop-Vac was founded by Martin Miller in 1953 under Craft Tool Company of New York. Miller wanted to replace the broom and dust pan in his workshop with a vacuum cleaner capable of collecting wood and metal chips too large for a conventional machine.

On December 28, 2020, GreatStar Tools USA announced the acquisition of Shop-Vac and its assets. The company reopened the Williamsport facility and rehired some employees who were laid off in September. Along with this, the company said they were going to bring the core production of vacuums back to the United States, while still producing some products in Asia.

On February 13, 2023, Hangzhou GreatStar Industrial and Shop-Vac announced the core production of vacuums will move overseas. This plan is part of Shop-Vac's reorganization of its American operations. This move would affect 80 employees. The company would keep the Williamsport facility as their headquarters and main distribution warehouse.
