= F crimp =

F-Crimp is a type of solderless electrical crimp connection. It is not related to the F connector common in RF equipment.

It is sometimes referred to as open-barrel, which is technically a more general term including crimp types such as Weather Pack and Metri Pack.

F-Crimp is a more mechanically robust crimp connection compared to the common barrel-crimp type readily available at retail locations (Radio Shack, Home Depot, etc.). It also has an optional second crimp section that crimps to the insulation, providing strain relief. Because of these characteristics, automobiles use F-Crimp almost exclusively. F-Crimp was devised to eliminate the need for soldered connections—crimping can be preferred to soldering in mass production because it is easier to reproduce reliable connections. These connections, when made with ratcheting application tooling, provide a solderless, "gas-tight" connection. F-Crimp connections are never soldered as application of solder can lead to fracturing of the wire conductor.

The term F-Crimp was originally coined by AMP Incorporated (now TE Connectivity), however terminals of this style are currently manufactured by multiple companies. Crimpers are available from multiple sources: manufacturers of the connectors typically offer industrial crimp devices for high volume production, and specialized hand tools companies such as Ideal, Eclipse and Greenlee (formerly Paladin) offer dies for hand crimpers. For instance, Ideal die #30-586 and Paladin die #2033 are designed for open barrel / F-Crimp connectors. Non-AMP crimpers are available in "ratcheting" ("Certi-Crimp") and non-ratcheting versions, but only ratcheting types are suitable for production applications, with non-ratcheting types being suitable for occasional, or "field" repairs. Non-ratcheted crimps must never be used in "mission critical" applications.
