= Ridgid =

Tool manufacturer

The Ridge Tool Company
- Type: Subsidiary
- Founded: 1923; 103 years ago in North Ridgeville, Ohio, U.S.
- Headquarters: Elyria, Ohio, United States
- Products: Tools
- Parent: Emerson Electric Co.
- Website: www.ridgid.com

The Ridge Tool Company is an American manufacturing company that makes and distributes tools under the Ridgid brand name. The company was founded in 1923 in North Ridgeville, Ohio. In 1943, it relocated to its current location in Elyria, Ohio, and in 1966, it became a wholly owned subsidiary of Emerson Electric.

Ridgid tools are targeted at the plumbing, pipe fitting, construction, and HVAC trades. The brand is best known for its distinctive red pipe wrenches, but the company manufactures over 300 different types of tools. The company also sells power tools, largely made by TTI, and wet/dry vacs, made by parent company Emerson.

Ridgid produced a pinup calendar from 1949 until 2016. Early renditions featured the work of American pin-up artist George Petty. Models having appeared on the calendar include Raquel Welch and Brooke Burke.

== Gallery ==
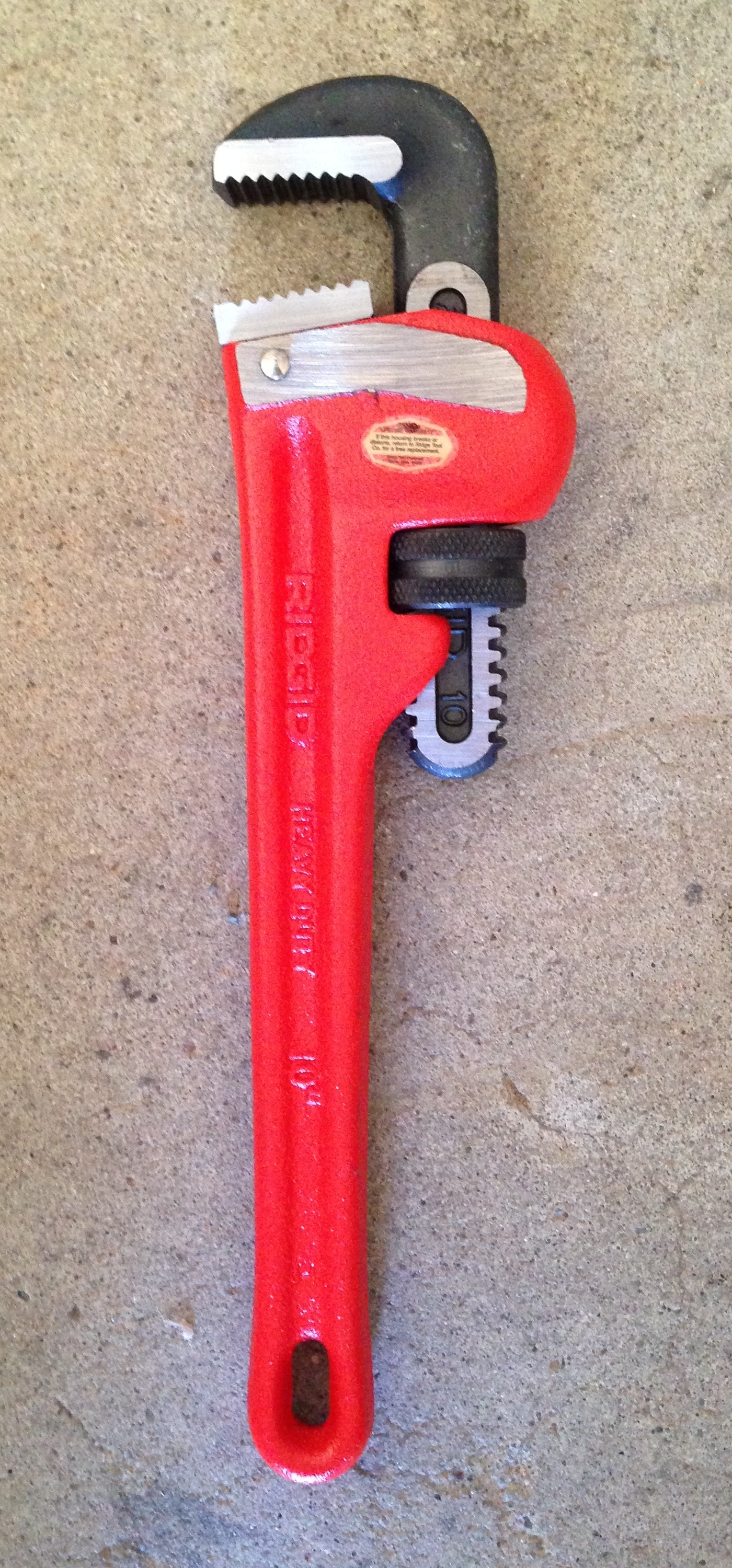
A 10" pipe wrench manufactured by Ridgid.

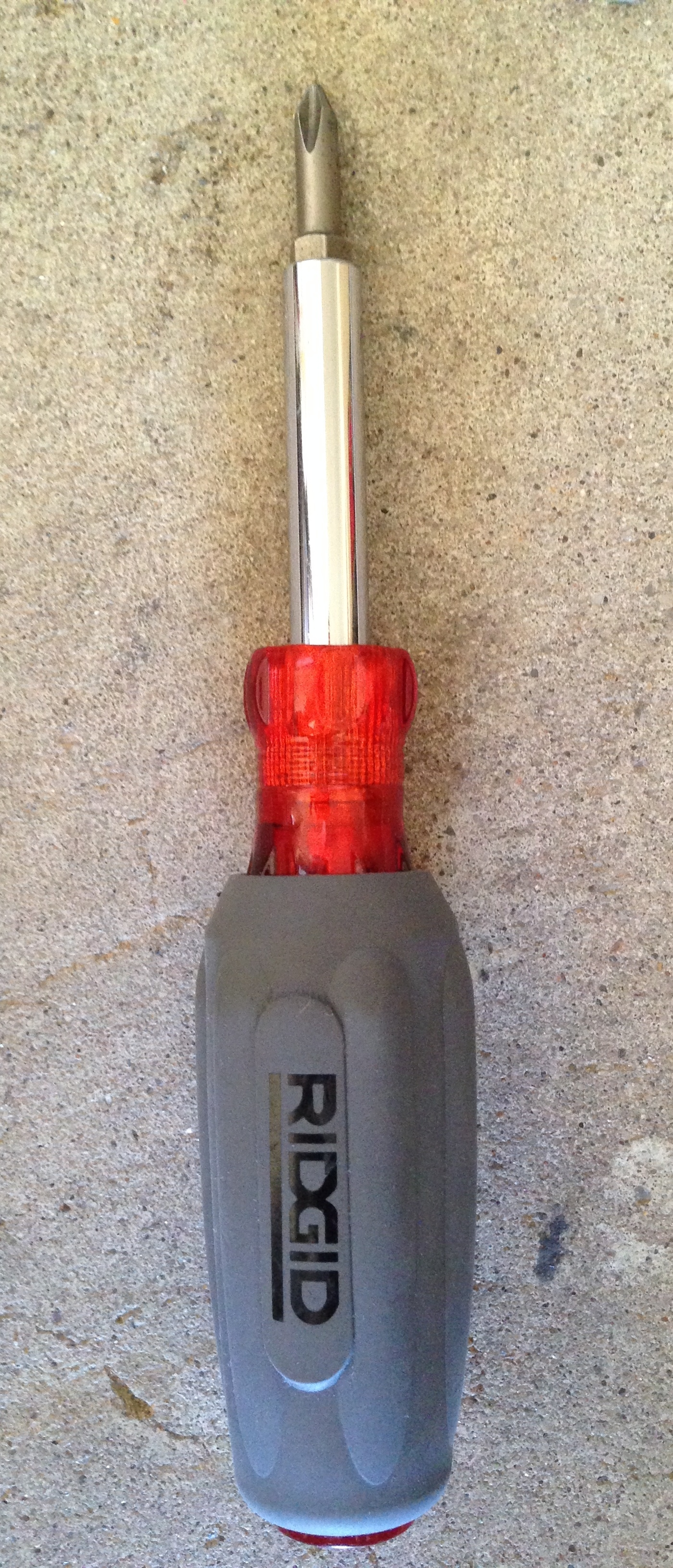
A 6-in-1 screwdriver manufactured by Western Forge for Ridgid.

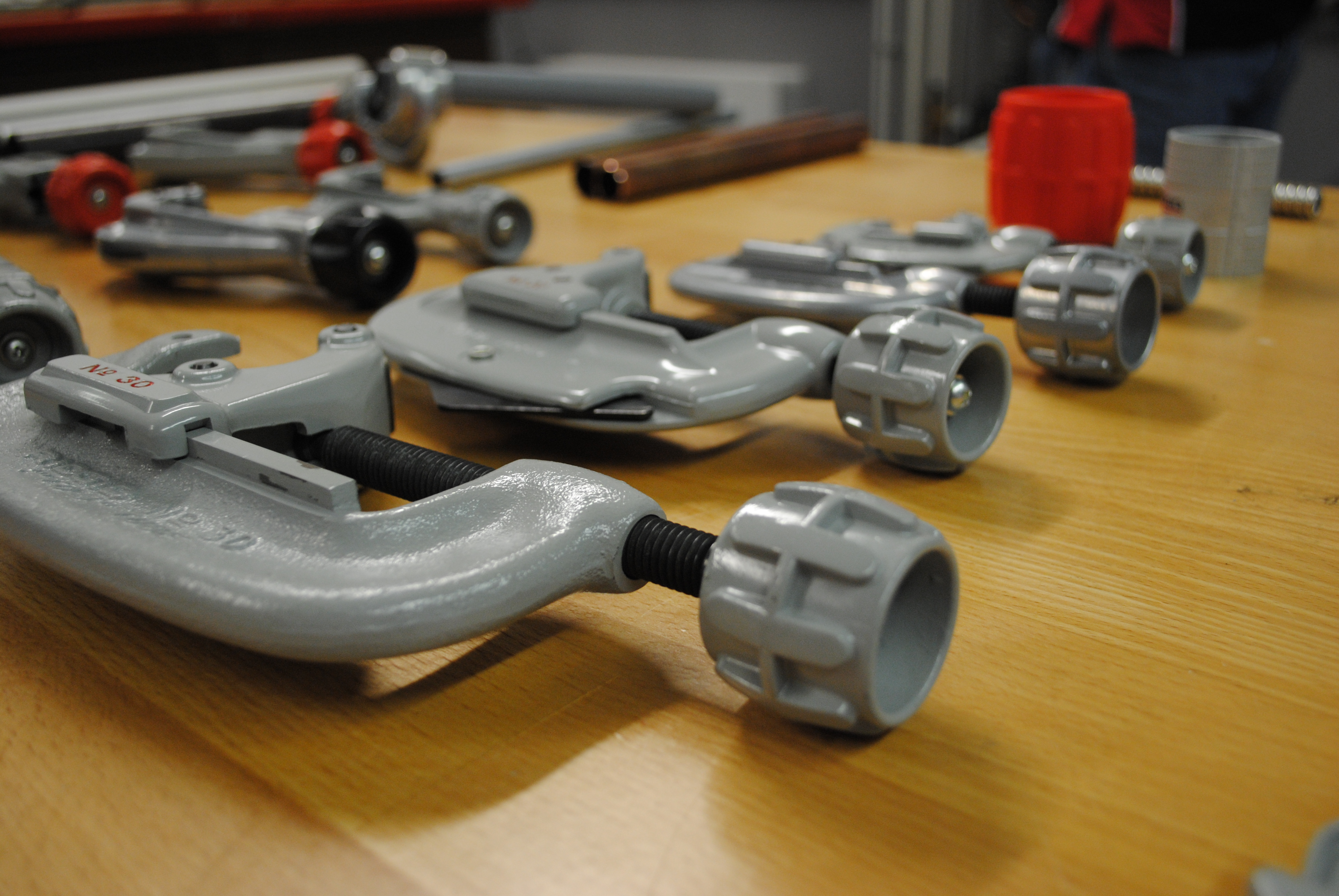
A number of Ridgid tubing cutters.

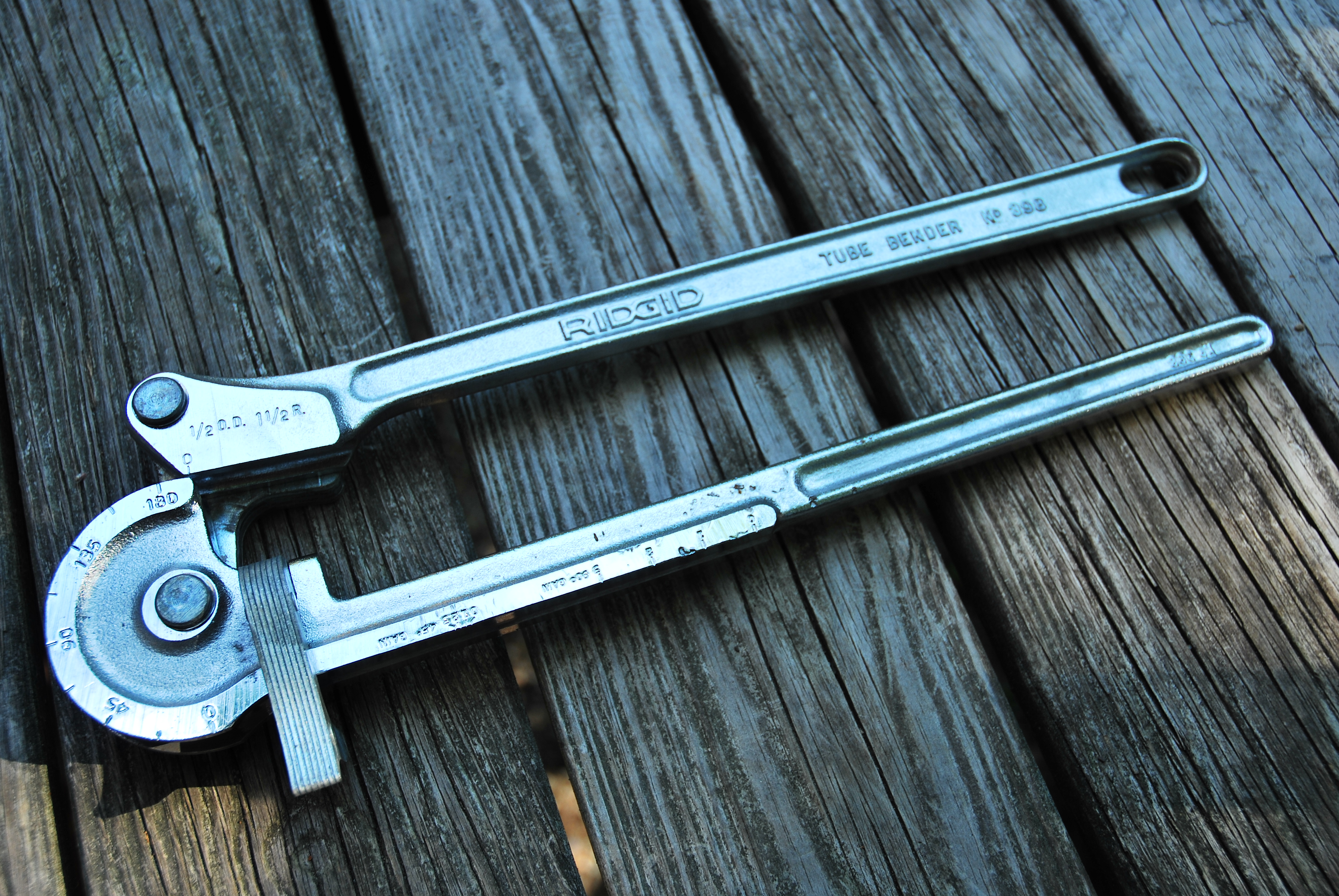
A Ridgid tubing bender.

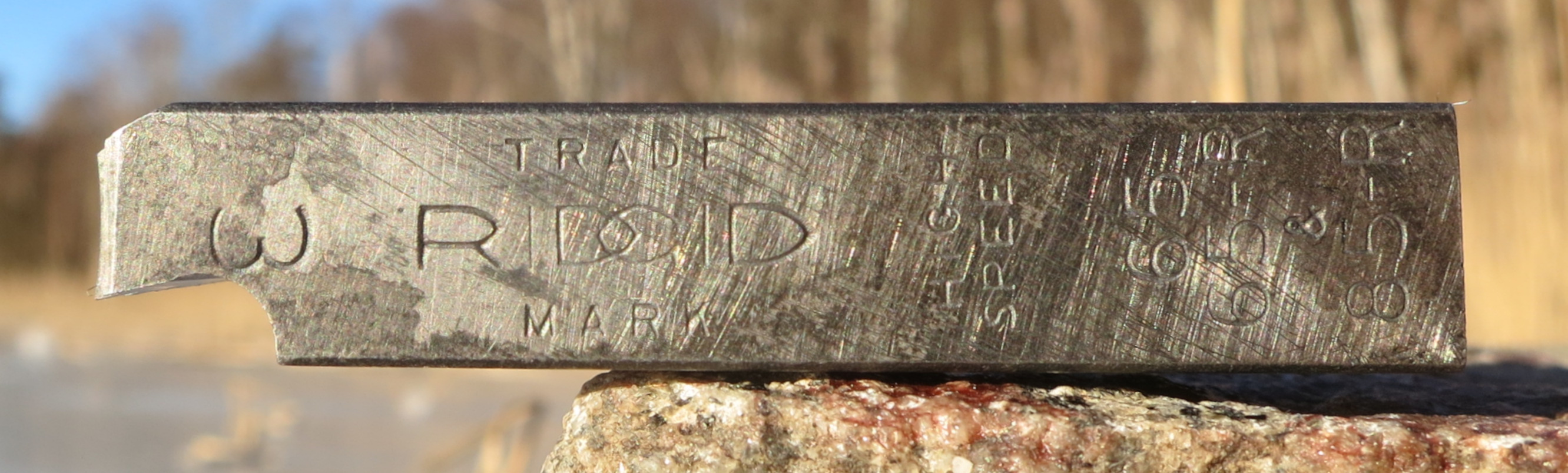
Ridgid die chaser from the 1980s.
