= FASTON terminal =

Electronic equipment

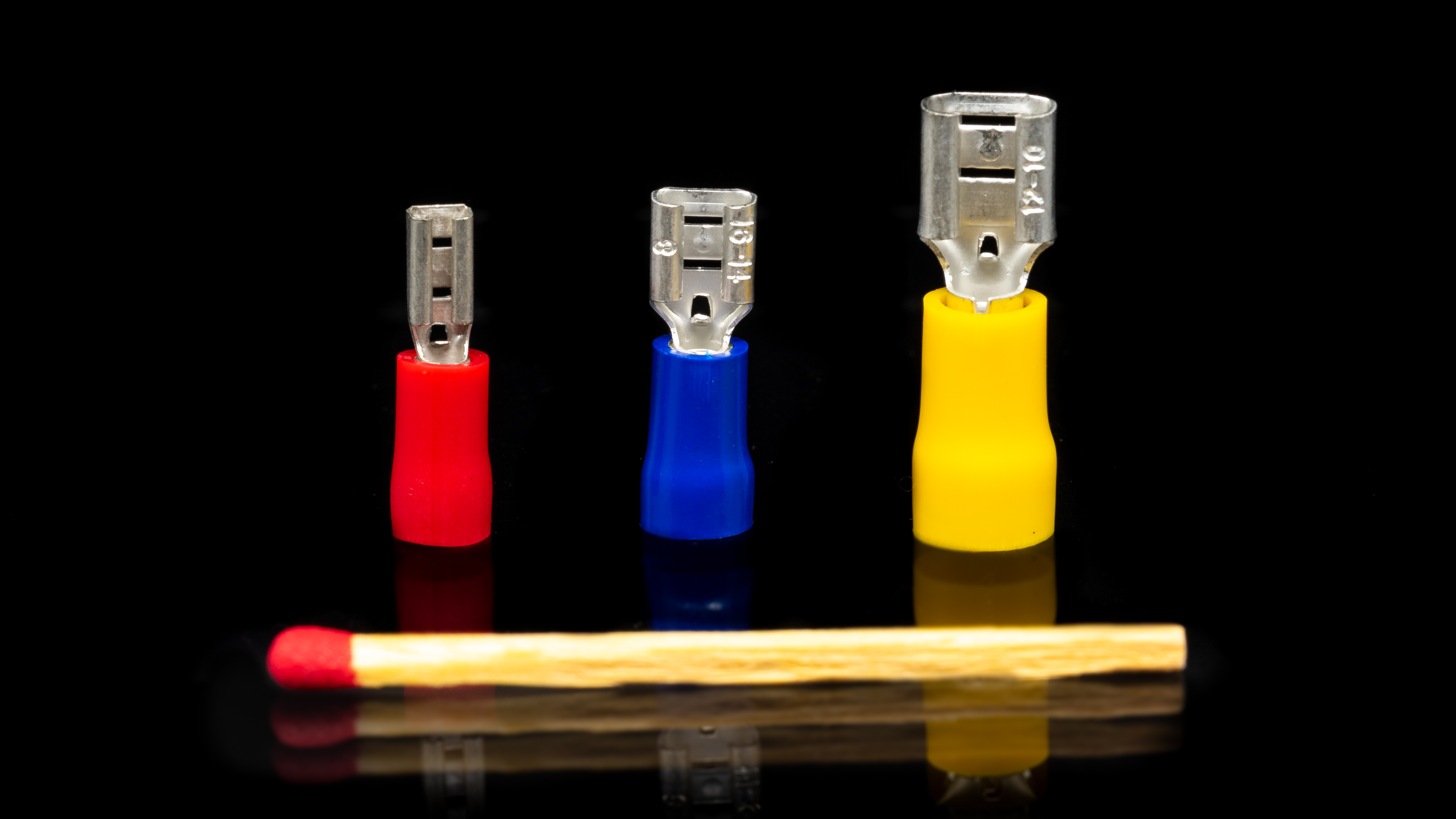
Faston female terminals in three sizes, with insulation

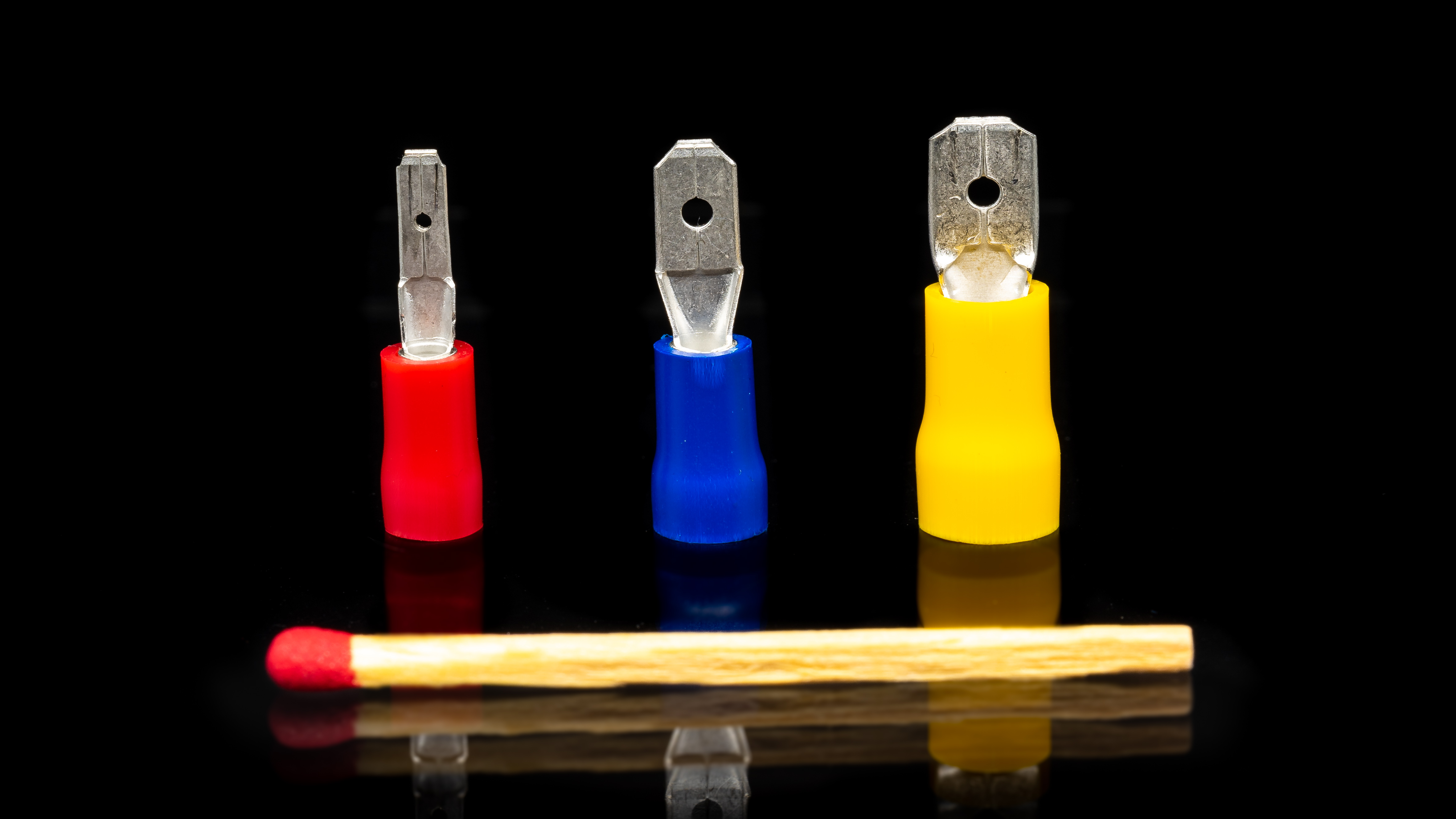
Faston male terminals in three sizes, with insulation

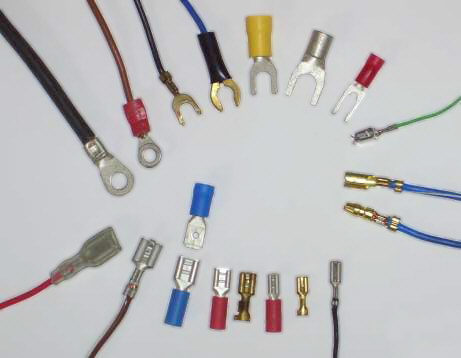
Various single wire connectors: FASTON blade terminals (bottom), ring terminals (2 left), spade terminals (5 top), bullet terminals, male and female (2 right with blue wires)

FASTON terminals are connectors that are widely used in electronic and electrical equipment. These terminals are manufactured by many companies, commonly using the terms "quick disconnect", "quick connect", "tab" terminals, or blade connectors; without qualifiers, the first two could be mistaken for plumbing connections.

== Description ==
The terminals are often called "quick disconnect" because the predecessors were screw terminals, which took longer to disconnect. The name "tab" terminals is a description of the shape of the male terminal.

Six series are covered in one of TE's catalogs (which omits the 0.375 in/9.5 mm, but mentions it elsewhere), named after their blade width in thousandths of an inch. Insulated versions of the terminals are color-coded to indicate what wire gauges they may be used with. The terminal system consists of tabs (male) and receptacles (female). There are free-hanging wire and circuit board mounted versions of both tabs and receptacles. All widths come mostly in one of two tab thicknesses: 0.032 and 0.020 in (0.8 and 0.5 mm).

A hand tool exists for crimping the terminals: the AMP Universal Handle.

They have been commonly used since the 1970s. Faston is a trademark.

== Specifications ==
- PIDG (Pre-Insulated Diamond Grip) FASTON (Nylon) terminals are defined in AMP Specification 114-1002: Terminal, FASTON, PIDG, Application of
- PLASTI-GRIP (Vinyl) (insulation restricting) terminals are defined in AMP Specification 114-1003: Terminal, FASTON, PLASTI-GRIP, Application of
- UL 310 "Standard for Electrical Quick-Connect Terminals"
- CSA 22.2 #153, "Quick-Connect Terminals"
- UL 486 also specifies the testing of standard wire connectors and soldering lugs.
- MIL-T-7928

== Crimp styles ==
Four main styles of crimps are specified by AMP:

- "F" Crimp for use on non-insulated connectors
- TETRA-CRIMP for use on insulated PIDG and PLASTI-GRIP connectors
- "C" Crimp, typically used for flag connectors (where the wire enters the connector perpendicular to the direction of tab insertion)
- Tab-Lok, typically used for flag connectors

== Wire gauge insulation colors ==
The colors are not for signal or polarity identification, but specify their compatible wire size range in AWG (or equivalent metric cross-sectional area):

Insulation color code	AWG size range	Comments
Yellow	26–22	
Transparent	24–20	
Red	22–16	
Blue	16–14	
Yellow/Black	16–14	Heavy duty
Yellow	12–10	
Red	8	
Blue	6	
Yellow	4	
Brown	2	
Blue	1/0	
Yellow	2/0	
Red	3/0	
Blue	4/0	

== Sizes and ratings ==
The series are the actual width of the male terminals in mils (thousandth of an inch). For example, 187 series has a width of 0.187-inch (4.75 mm).

=== 375 series ===
0.375-inch (9.5 mm) male tab width

- 10 mm^{2} (0.016 sq in), 28 A (continuous)

=== 312 series ===
0.312-inch (7.92 mm) male tab width

- 4–6 mm^{2} (0.0062–0.0093 sq in), 28 A (continuous)
- 2.5 mm^{2} (0.0039 sq in), 14 A (continuous)
- 1.5 mm^{2} (0.0023 sq in), 10 A (continuous)
- 1.0 mm^{2} (0.0016 sq in), 8 A (continuous)
- 0.75 mm^{2} (0.00116 sq in), 7 A (continuous)

=== 250 series ===
0.250-inch (6.35 mm) male tab width

- 10 AWG, 24 A (continuous)
- 12 AWG, 20 A (continuous)
- 14 AWG, 15 A (continuous)
- 16 AWG, 10 A (continuous)
- 18 AWG, 7 A (continuous)
- 20 AWG, 4 A (continuous)
- 22 AWG, 3 A (continuous)

=== 205 series ===
0.205-inch (5.21 mm) male tab width

- 14 AWG, 15 A (continuous)
- 16 AWG, 10 A (continuous)
- 18 AWG, 7 A (continuous)
- 20 AWG, 4 A (continuous)
- 22 AWG, 3 A (continuous)

=== 187 series ===
0.187-inch (4.75 mm) male tab width

- 16 AWG, 10 A (continuous)
- 18 AWG, 7 A (continuous)
- 20 AWG, 4 A (continuous)
- 22 AWG, 3 A (continuous)

=== 125 series ===
0.125-inch (3.18 mm) male tab width

=== 110 series ===
0.110-inch (2.79 mm) male tab width

- 16 AWG, 5 A (continuous)
- 18 AWG, 4 A (continuous)
- 20 AWG, 3 A (continuous)
- 22 AWG, 2 A (continuous)
