= Ideal Industries =

American manufacturer of electrical connectors and tools

- Company type: Privately owned
- Industry: Manufacturing
- Founded: 1916 in Chicago, Illinois
- Founder: J. Walter Becker
- Headquarters: Sycamore, Illinois
- Key people: Meghan Juday Chairman; Steve Henn CEO; Vicki Slomka SVP; Kevin Lamb CFO
- Products: Connectors, hand tools, testers, meters
- Number of employees: 1,225
- Website: www.idealindustries.com

Ideal Industries is an American company that produces connectors, hand tools, testers, and meters for the electrical and telecommunications industries.

The company manufactures many of its products in the United States. It also owns Pratt-Read, one of the largest American-made producers of screwdrivers respectively at the time of their acquisition.

It is a competitor to Klein Tools and Greenlee Tools and its tools are sold at Lowe's and Ace Hardware stores as well as many independent distributors.

== History ==
Ideal was founded in 1916 by J. Walter Becker as the Ideal Commutator Dresser Company in Chicago, Illinois, manufacturing commutator dresser stones. In 1924, Becker relocated the company to its current location in Sycamore, Illinois. By 1949, it had become the United States' leading producer of wire nuts.

In 2010, Ideal acquired three American hand tool manufacturers: Western Forge in January, Pratt-Read in March, and SK Hand Tools in August.

Ideal acquired Cree Lighting (not including Cree LED) in 2019, and sold the business to Advanced Lighting Technologies (ADLT) in 2023.

== Gallery ==
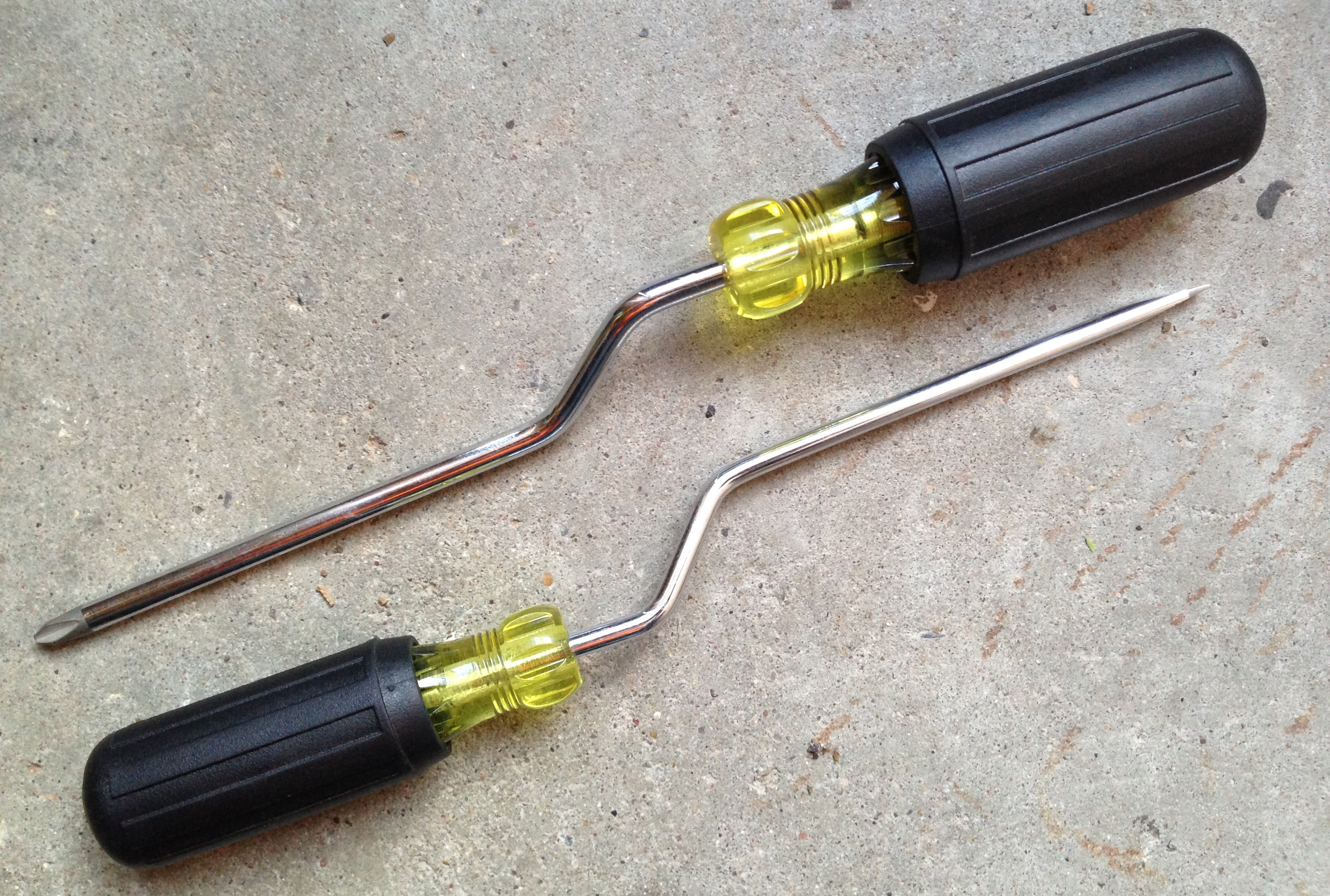
Speed screwdrivers.

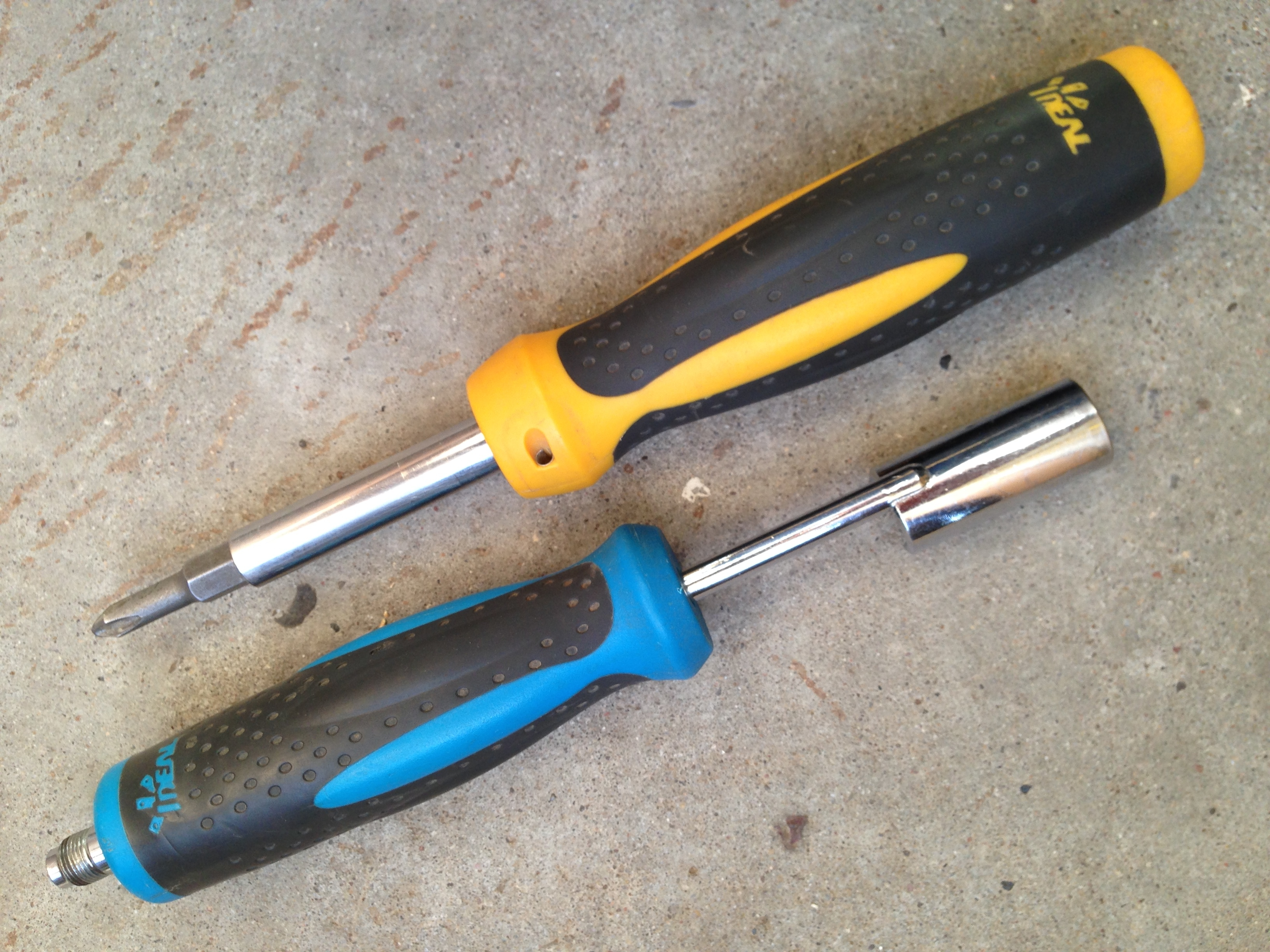
Multi-bit screwdriver and F connector tool.

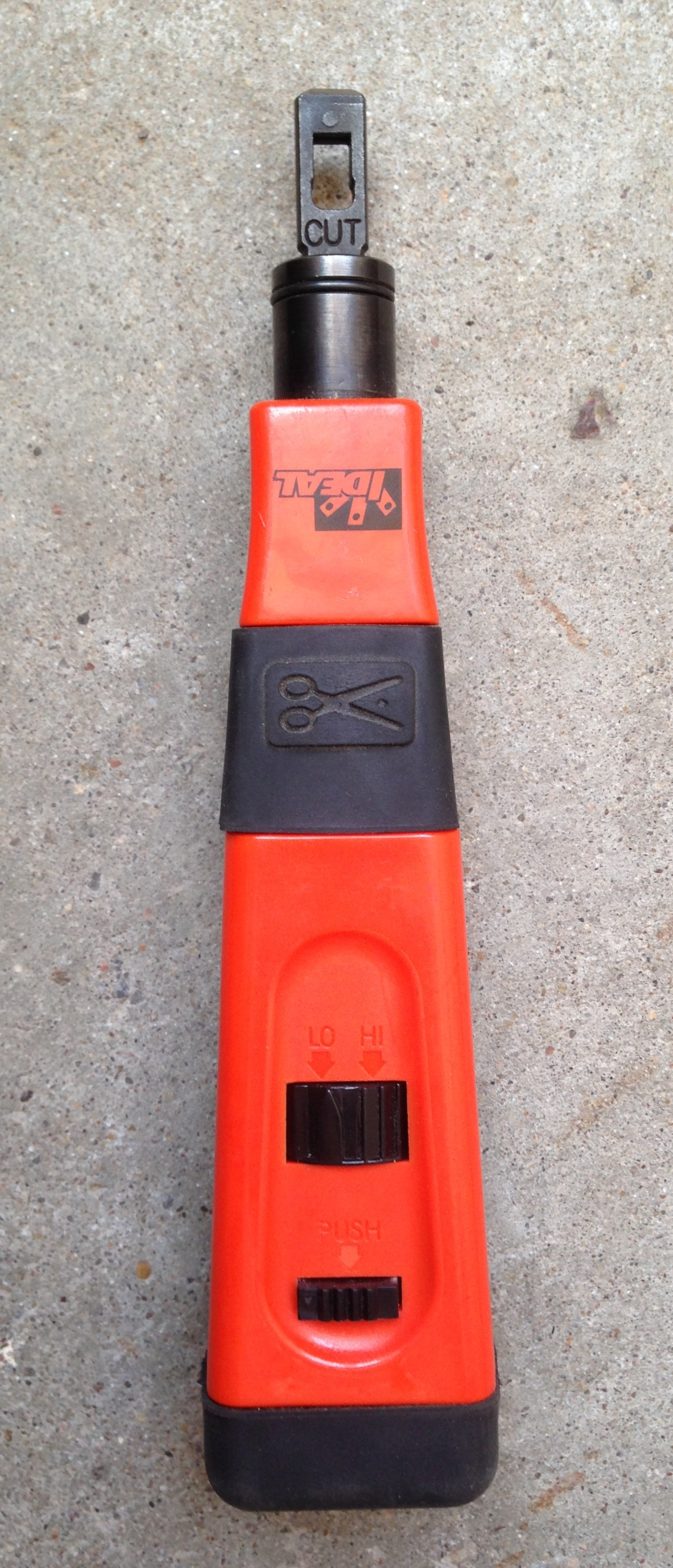
A punchdown tool.

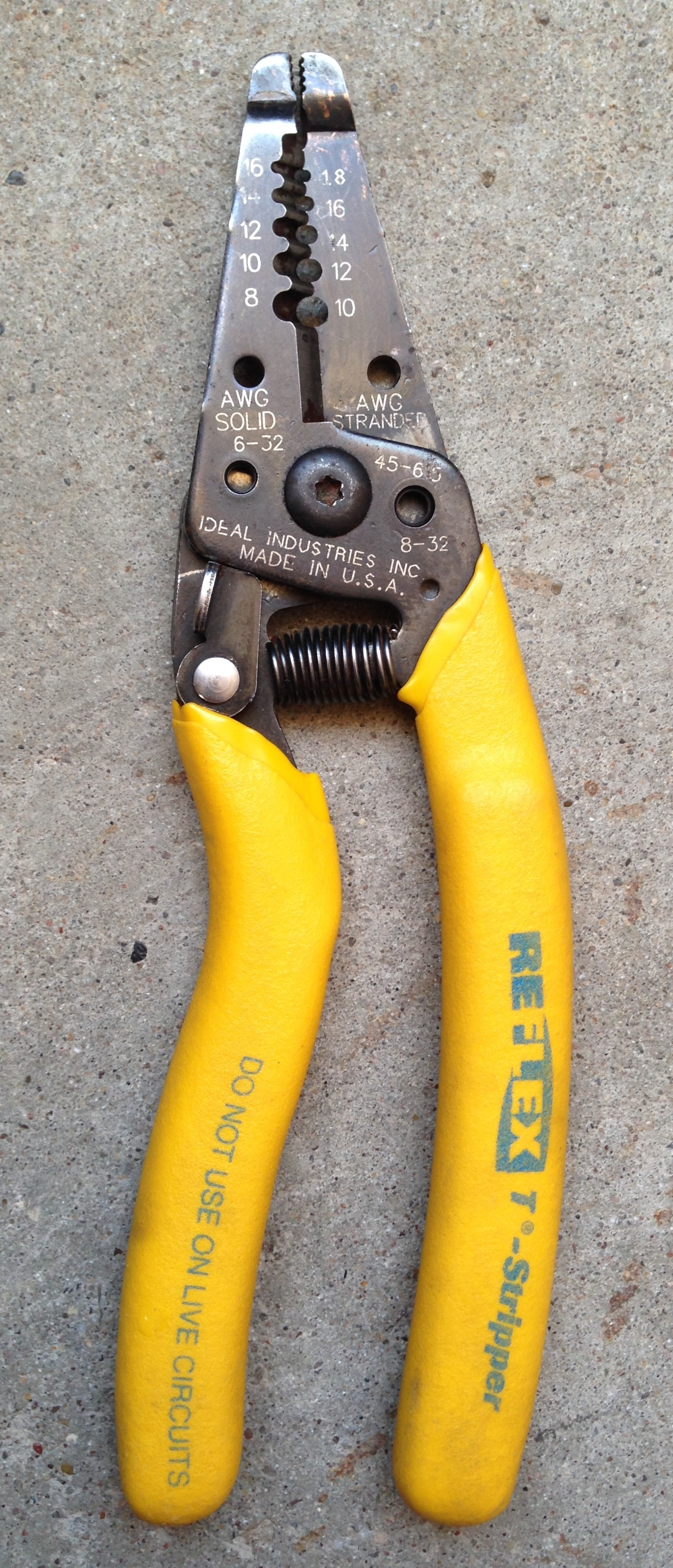
A wire stripper.

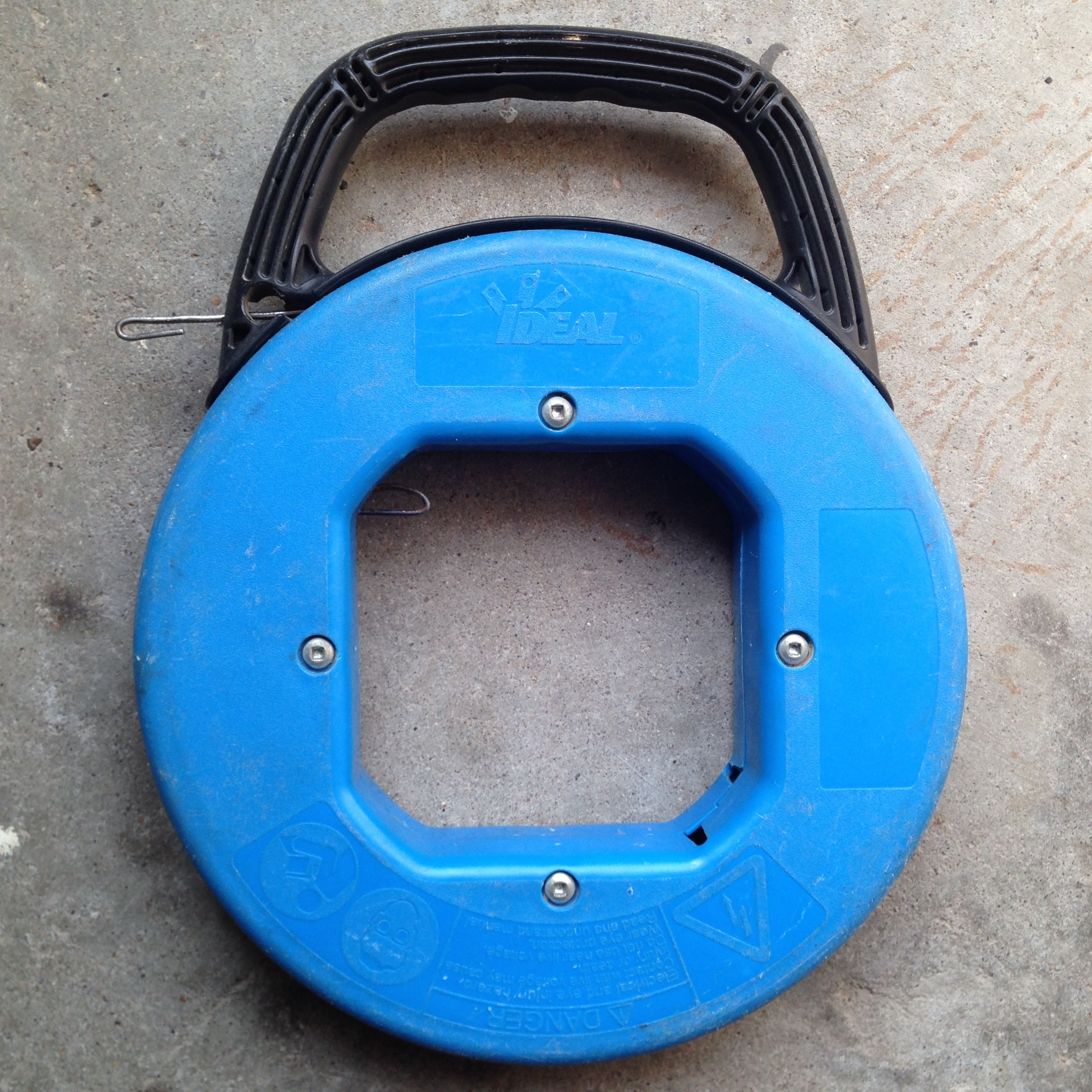
A 75' steel fish tape.

== IDEAL Subsidiaries ==
- Anderson Power Products
- Enatel
- Lacelok
- Power Puck
- Pratt-Read Tools

Former Subsidiaries

- CMD
- Casella
- SK Hand Tools
- Western Forge
