= Western Forge =

American manufacturing company

- Company type: Subsidiary of Ideal Industries
- Industry: Manufacturing
- Founded: 1965 in Defiance, Ohio
- Founder: C. William Schlosser
- Defunct: 2020
- Fate: Closed up shop
- Headquarters: Colorado Springs, Colorado
- Products: Hand tools
- Website: www.westernforge.com

Western Forge was an American manufacturing company. The company manufactured hand tools that were sold under other brands, including private-label brands such as Craftsman and Husky. It was a subsidiary of Ideal Industries.

The company was the largest American manufacturer of screwdrivers, though the company was relatively unknown because it sold no tools under its own name.

== History ==
Western Forge was founded in Defiance, Ohio in 1965 as a joint venture between Sears and C. William Schlosser to make torque wrenches. In 1966, it relocated to Colorado Springs, Colorado, where it built a new manufacturing facility. In the next few years, the company began producing screwdrivers, punches, chisels, adjustable wrenches, and pliers. The company's slogan at one time was "Mile High Quality" (due to its proximity to Denver, Colorado, which is known as the Mile High City; many different companies in this part of Colorado incorporate the "Mile High" adjective in their name and/or advertising). Sears Craftsman product made by Western Forge will have a "WF" typically stamped on the product and sometimes a letter or symbol as a date code.

In 1976, Western Forge shipped its 100 millionth Craftsman screwdriver. In 2008, the company produced its billionth screwdriver overall.

In 1978, Western Forge applied for and received its USA trademark. They produced and test marketed a line of hand tools branded with their own name.

In 1981, the company was acquired by Emerson Electric.

In the late 1990s, Western Forge moved its screwdriver production to a plant in Murphy, North Carolina. In April 2006, it closed the Murphy plant and consolidated its operations in Colorado Springs, citing declining sales. The company received $200,000 in cash incentives from the City of Colorado Springs and the Colorado Springs Economic Development Corporation to stay in Colorado Springs. Sears Craftsman products (and others) that are produced by Western Forge are marked with a "WF" on them.

In 2007, the company was acquired by MW Universal. In 2010, it was acquired by Ideal Industries.

In April 2017, Ideal declined to renew its contract with Sears and stopped supplying it with tools. Sears filed a lawsuit against the company in June, contending that it was not honoring the terms of its supply agreement. Sears Craftsman tools that were previously produced by Western Forge in the US are now supplied by an Asian supplier.

In February 2020, Ideal announced that it would close the Western Forge manufacturing plant, laying off all 164 employees. Ideal had attempted to sell the facility but was unsuccessful. Ideal CEO Steve Henn said in a statement, "This was a long and carefully considered decision. Our Western Forge employees delivered high quality product and did everything we asked of them to help us maintain the business. We just couldn't survive the impact from the Craftsman move."

== Gallery ==
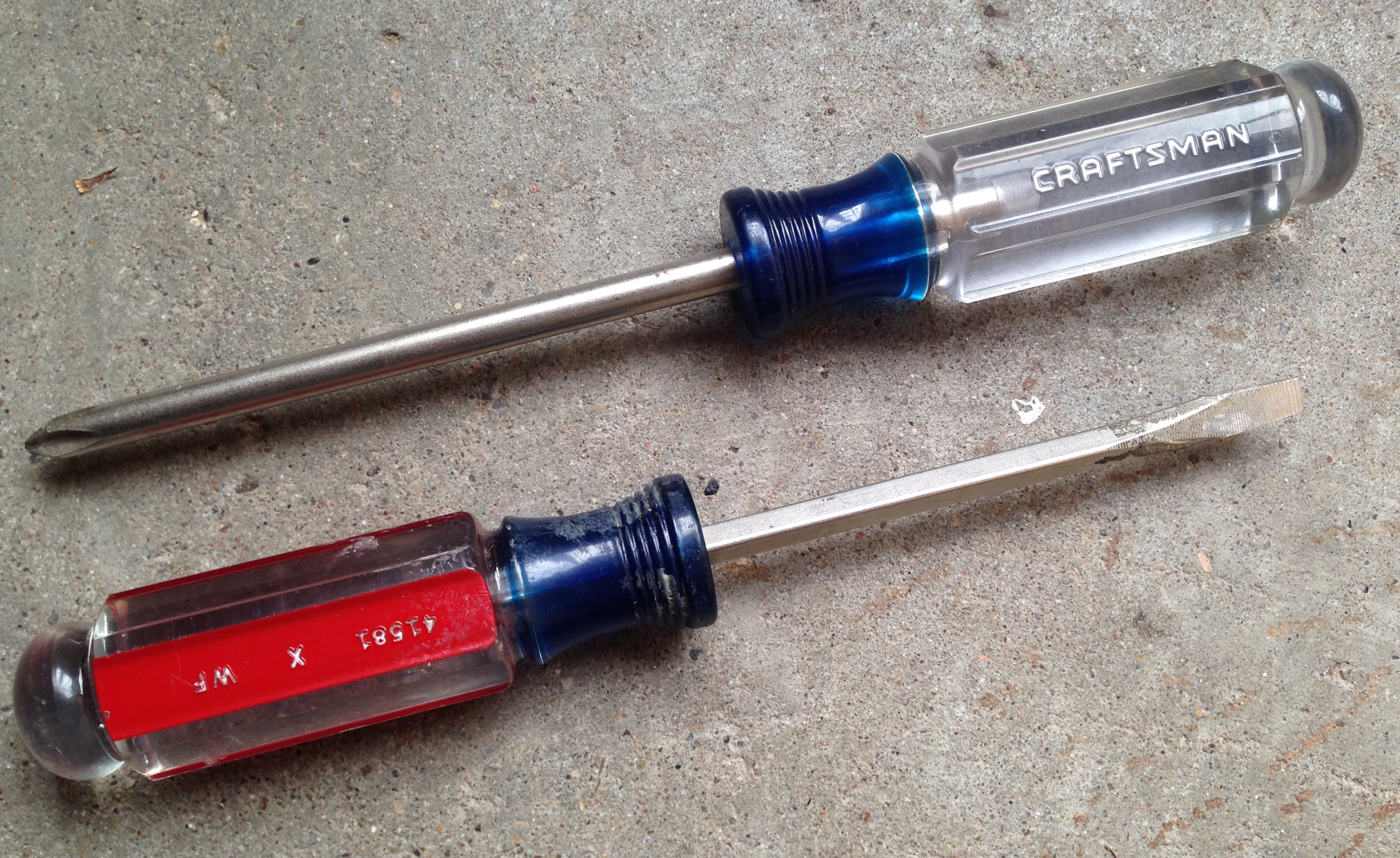
Craftsman screwdrivers.

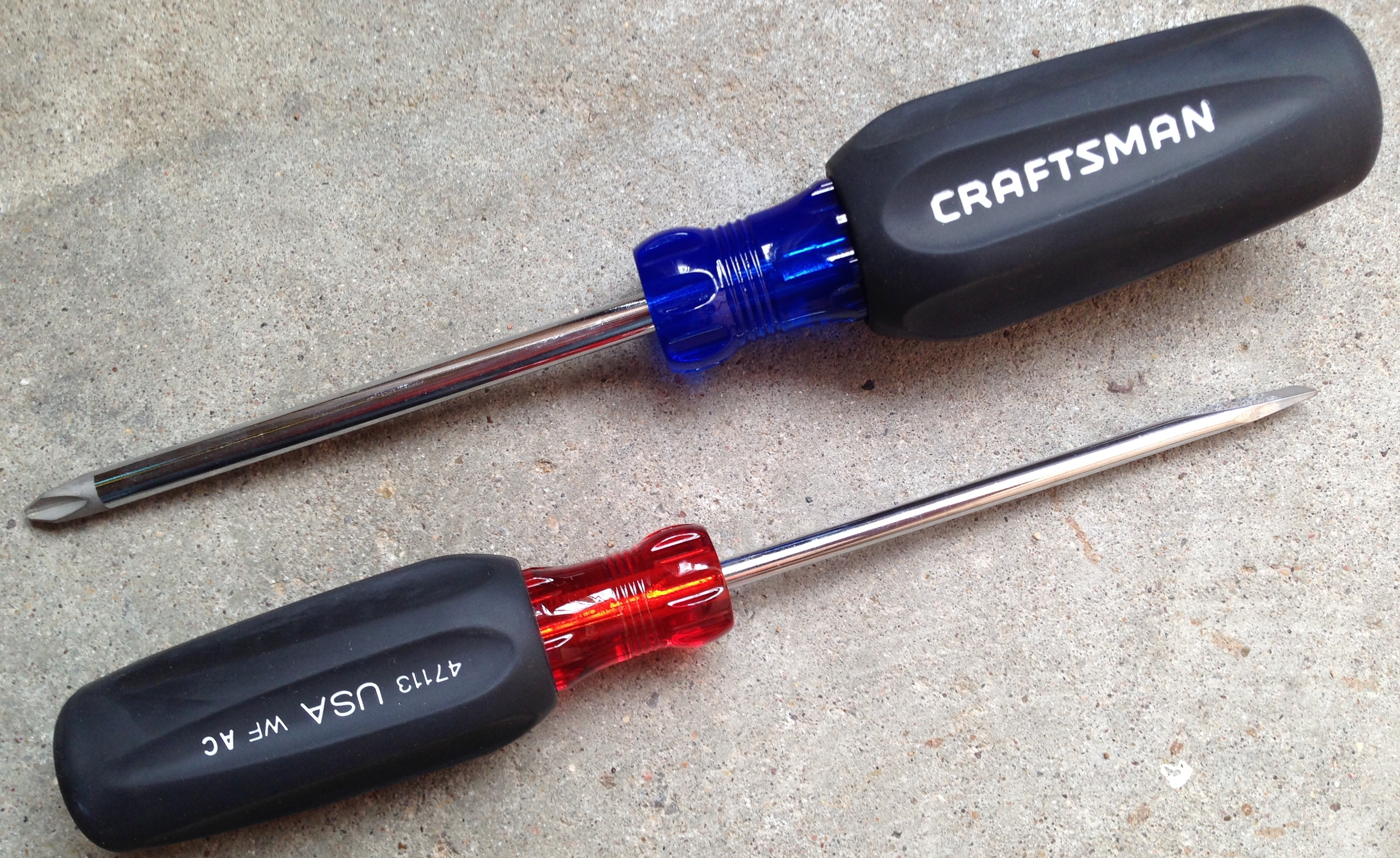
Craftsman cushion grip screwdrivers.

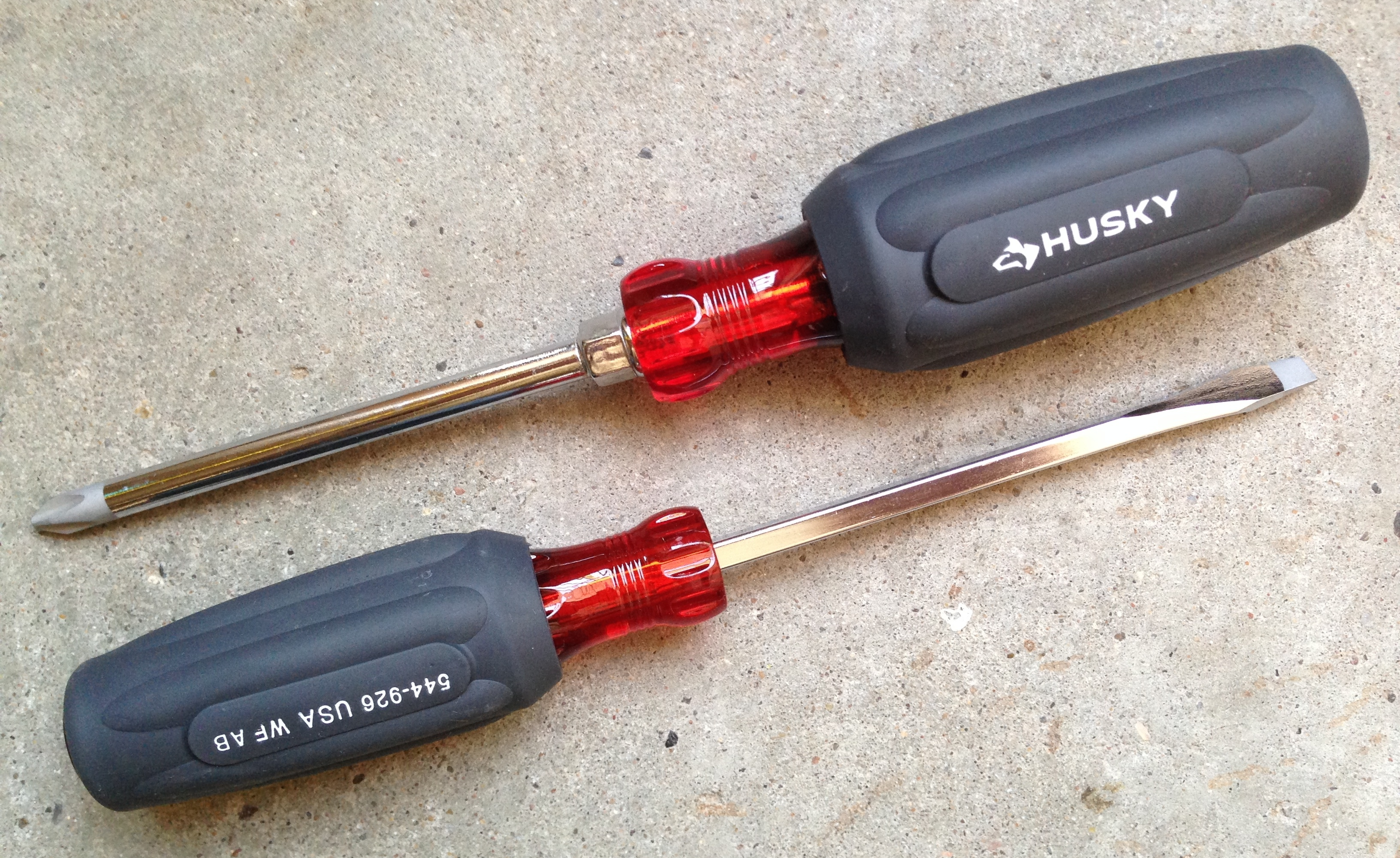
Husky Pro screwdrivers.

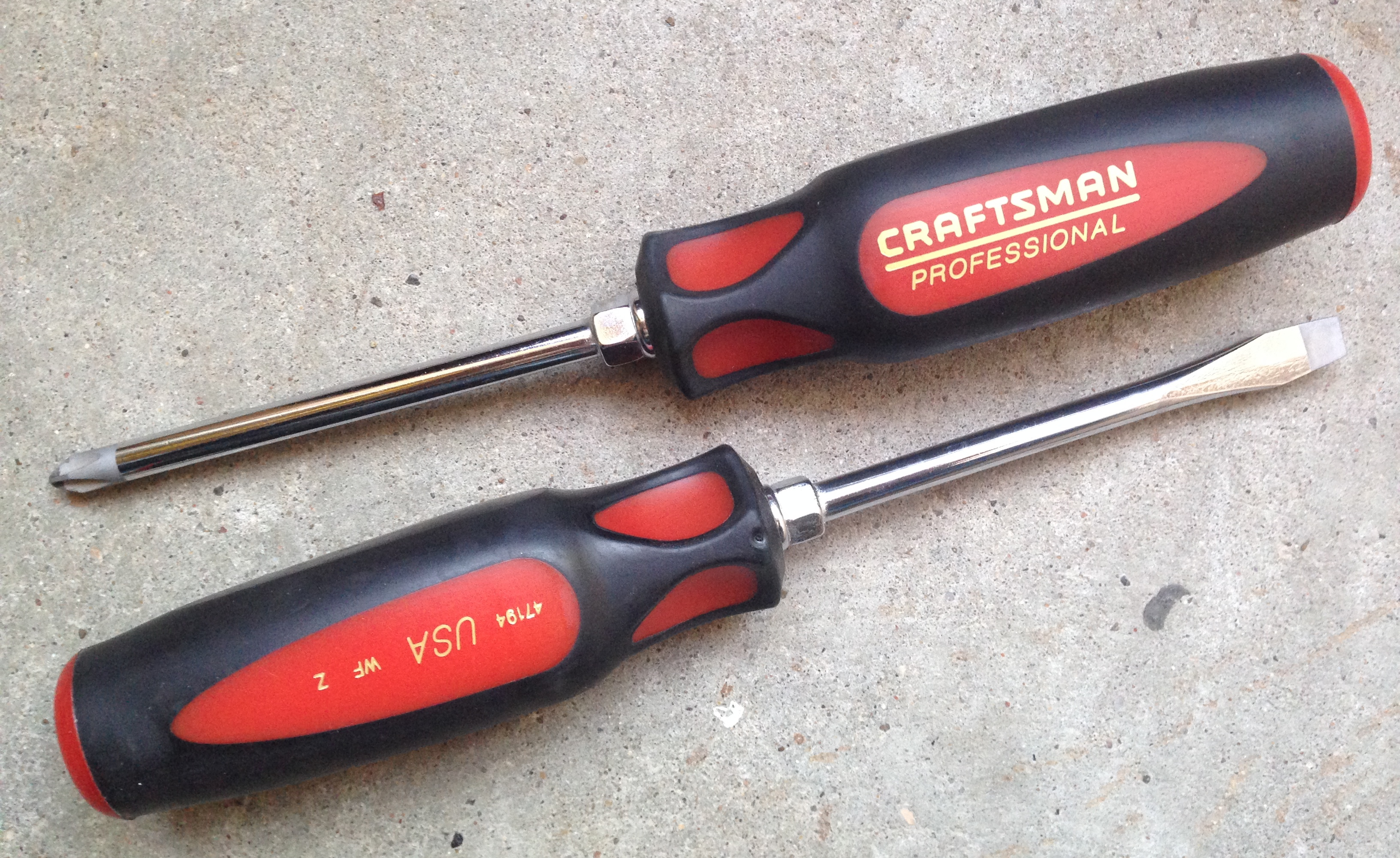
Craftsman Professional screwdrivers.

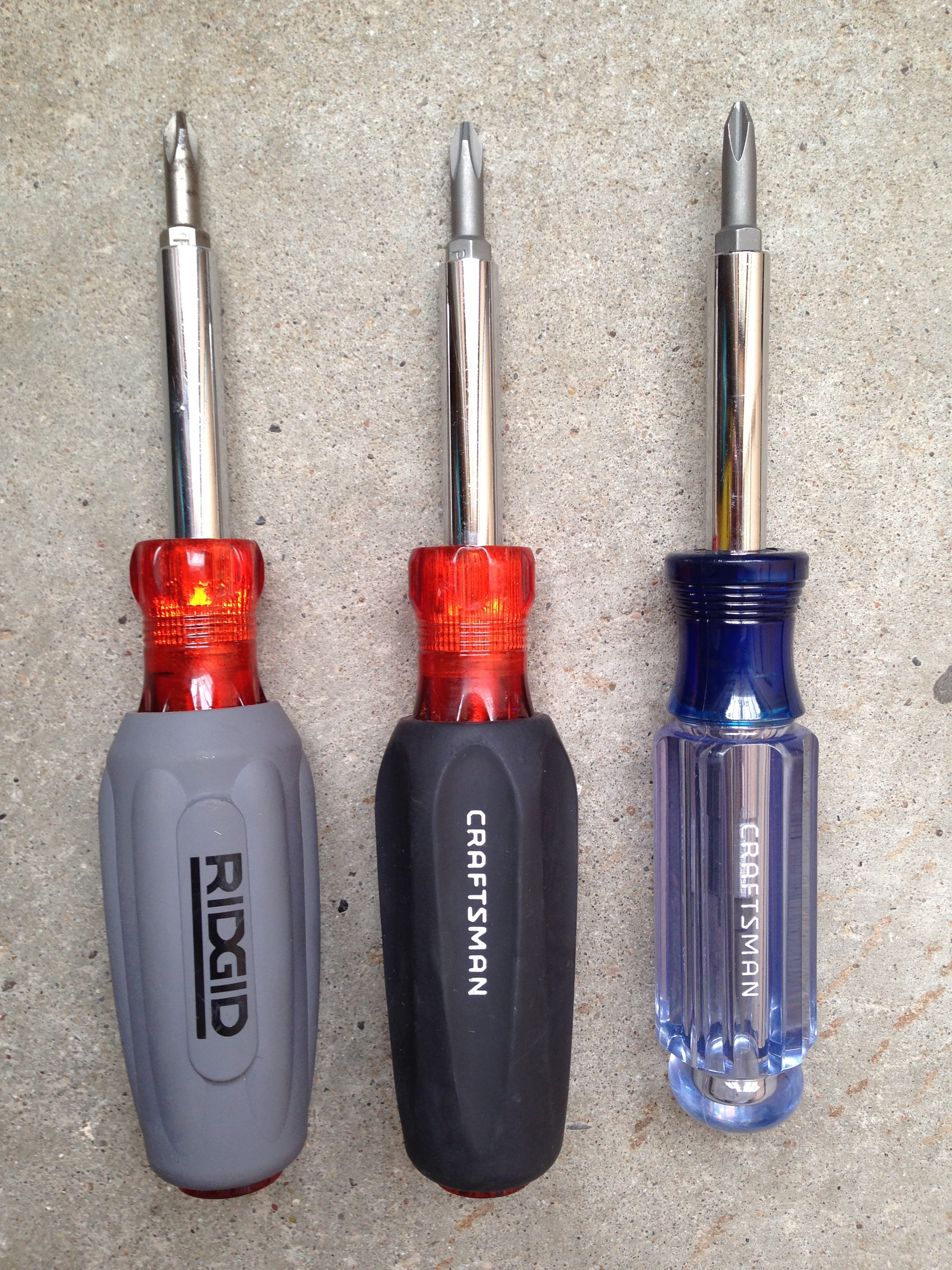
Ridgid and Craftsman multibit screwdrivers made by Western Forge.

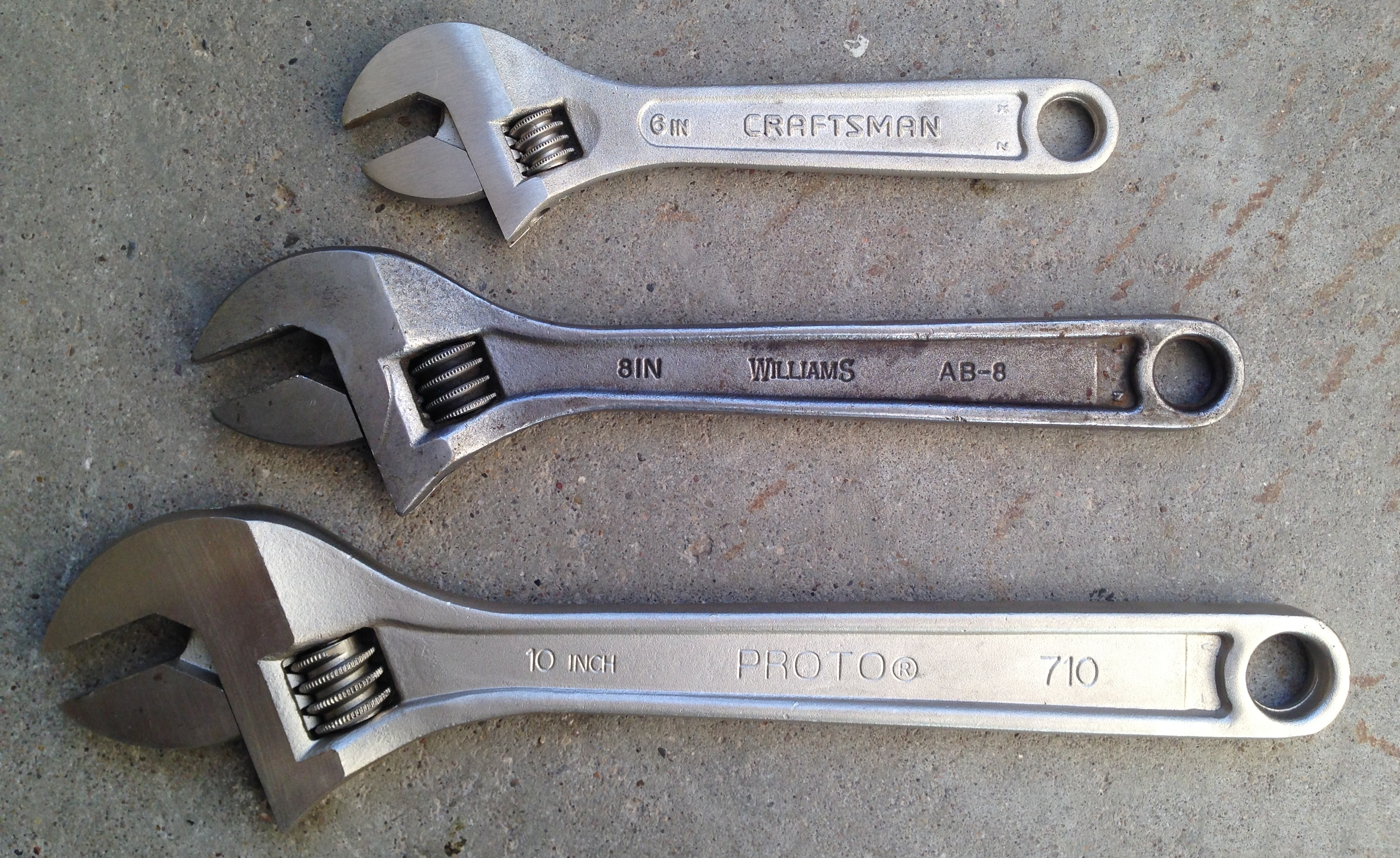
Craftsman, Williams, and Proto adjustable wrenches.

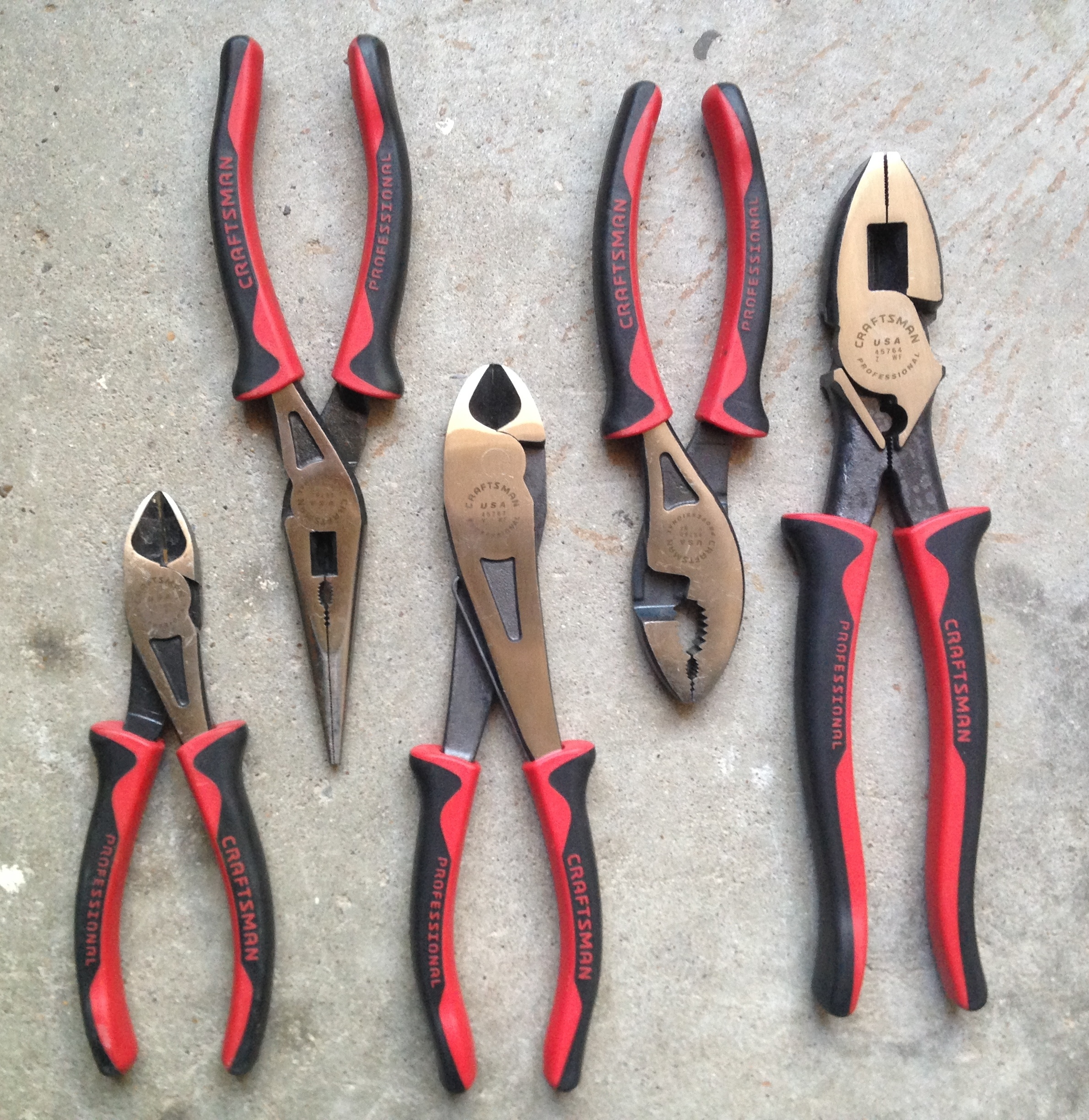
Craftsman Professional pliers.

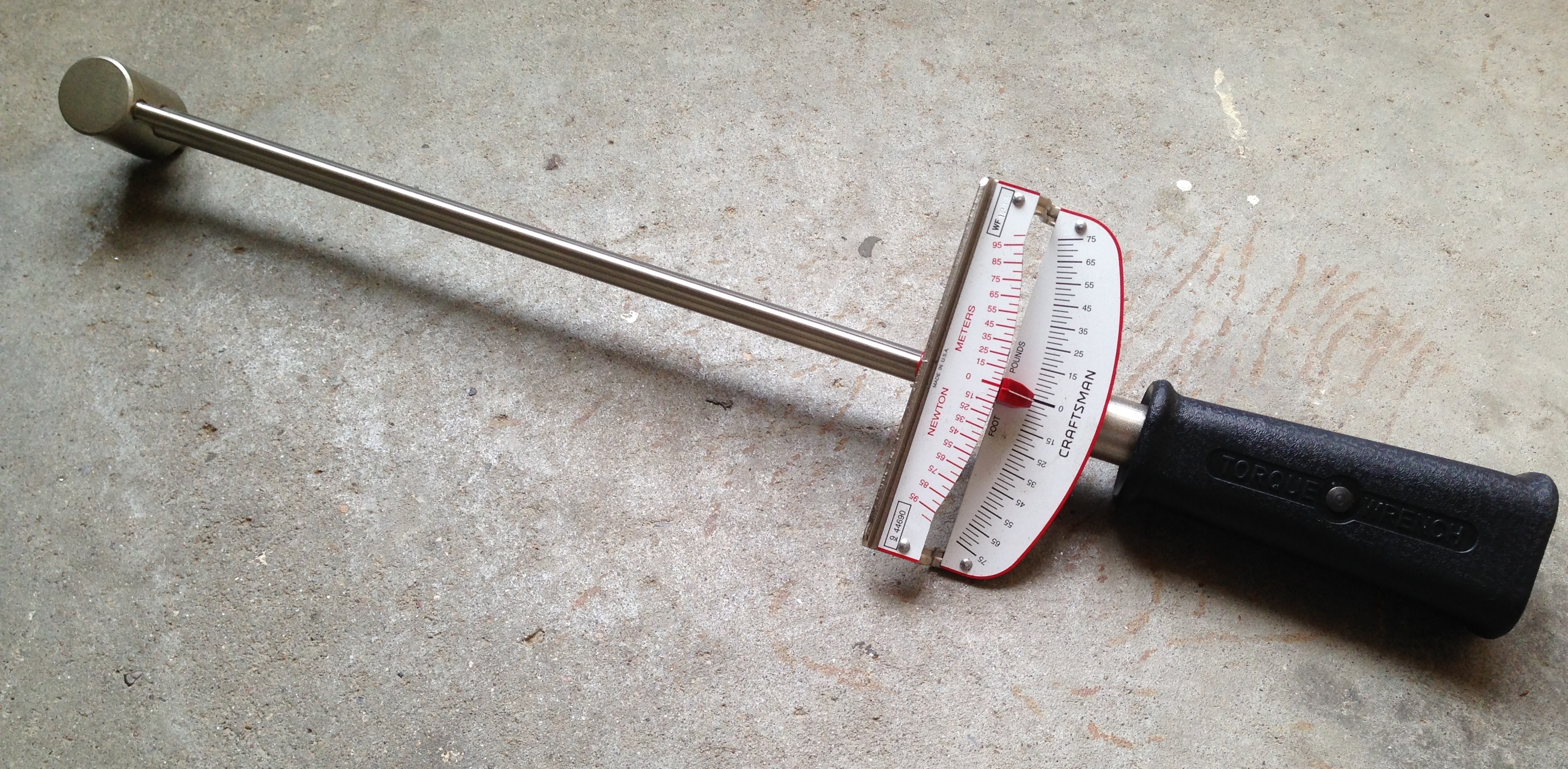
Craftsman beam torque wrench.

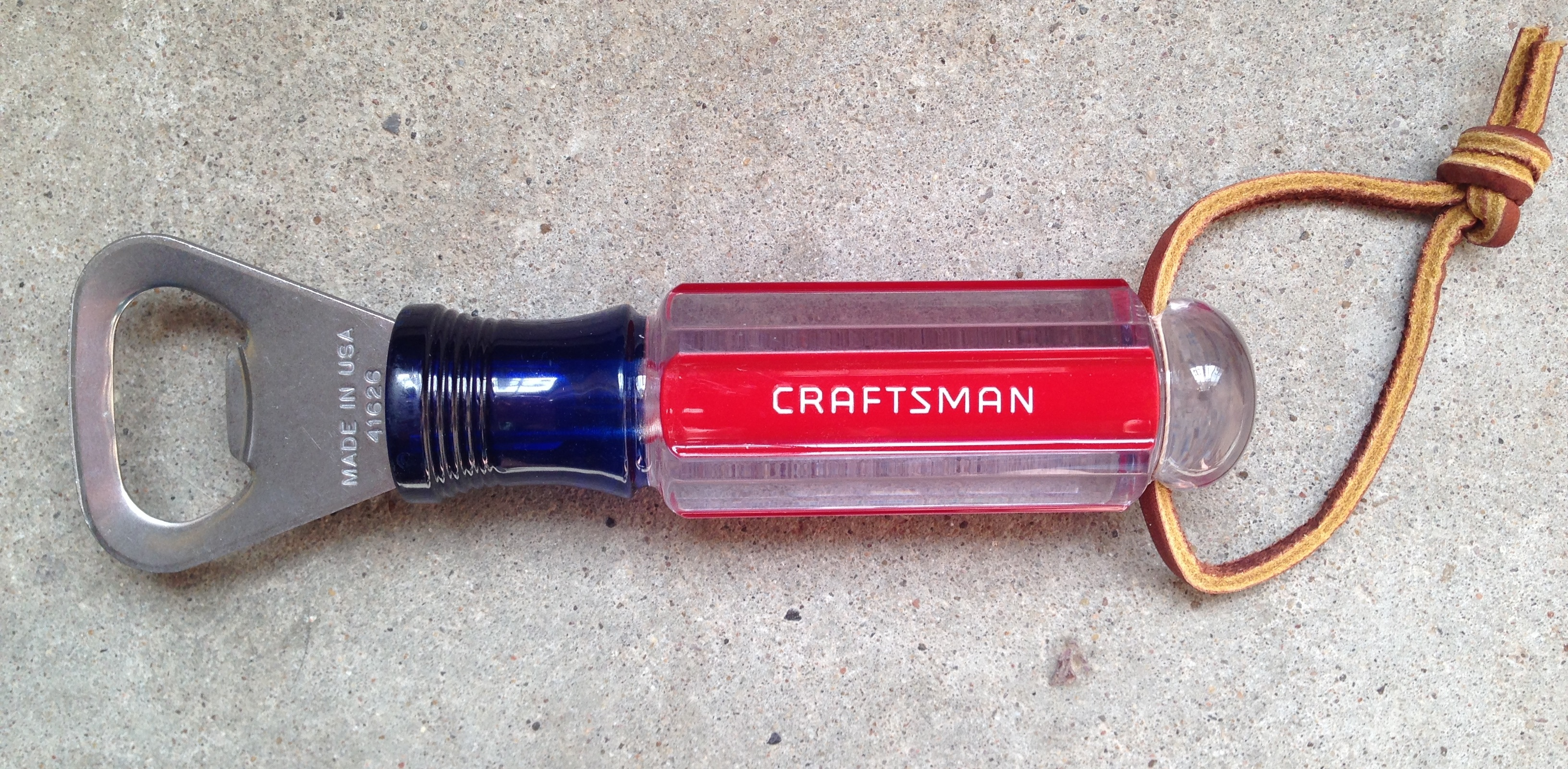
Craftsman bottle opener.
