= Lucar =

English automobile by Lucar London

The Lucar was an English automobile manufactured in Brixton, London, from 1913 until 1914. It featured a 4-cylinder, 9 hp, 1093 cc Aster engine and electric lamps. It was manufactured by Lucar London, Limited.
