= Morris Abrams =

American businessesman (1908–1981)

- Born: 1908
- Died: March 20, 1981 (aged 73); Englewood, New Jersey
- Known for: Arrow Fastener Co., Inc.

Morris Abrams (1908–1981) was the founder of Arrow Fastener Co., Inc., a manufacturer of fastening tools that has been a subsidiary of Hangzhou GreatStar Industrial since 2017.

== History ==
Abrams was the first generation of his family to be born in the United States.

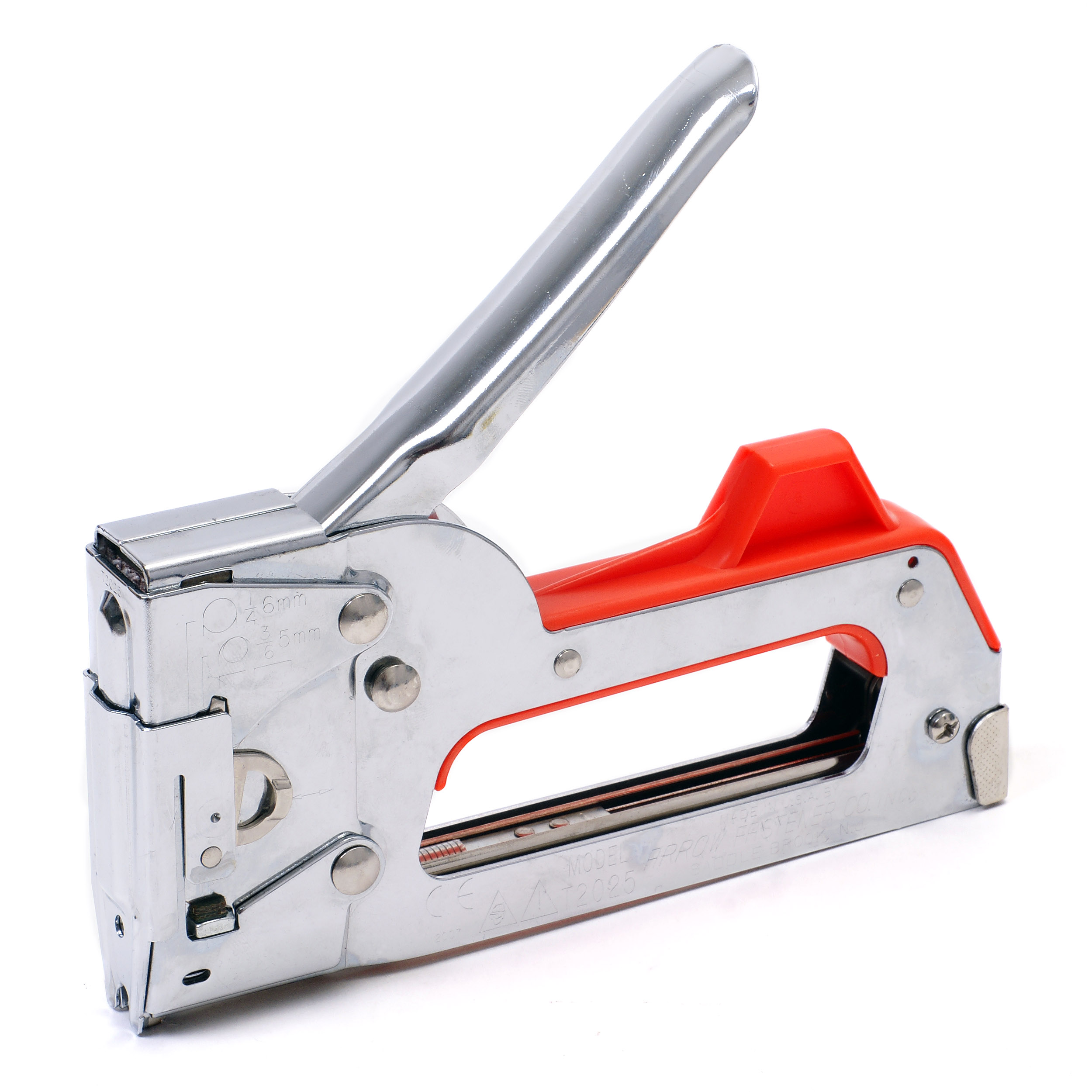
Arrow brand staple gun.

In 1929, Morris Abrams founded Arrow Fastener. At first, he sold staples for staplers currently on the market, but by 1940 he had received his first stapler patent, and by 1943, was assigning his patents to Arrow Fastener, a process he continued into the 1950s as he patented the hammer tacker and the staple gun. One model of his staple gun, the T50, was introduced in the early 1950s, became a registered trademark of the company in 1989, and by 1994, had resulted in over 40 million sales. It continues to be in production into the 21st century.

In the 1960s, after Morris Abrams became ill, his son Allan Abrams took over the family business which continued to grow to include glue guns, rivet tools, and brad nailers. Morris died in 1981.

In September 1999, Arrow was one of five home improvement companies purchased by Masco Corporation. It was subsequently purchased by Hangzhou GreatStar Industrial in 2017.
