= Enatel =

New Zealand electronics company

Enatel is an electronics company based in Christchurch, New Zealand. Established in 2002, the company designs and manufactures standby power supplies for telecommunications companies. It also produces industrial and commercial battery chargers for electric vehicles, particularly forklifts. Enatel is an example of a New Zealand manufacturer filling a "global niche", according to the country's Ministry of Business, Innovation and Employment.
