= New Britain Machine Company =

Former tool company in Connecticut, USA

- Product type: Woodworking machines, hand tools
- Country: United States of America
- Introduced: 1887 (or 1895)
- Discontinued: 1990
- Previous owners: Litton Industries

New Britain Machine Company was a tool company that was headquartered in New Britain, Connecticut. The company started to sell woodworking machines, sockets and drive tools. New Britain was the main supplier for NAPA tools until its closure in 1990. New Britain Machine owned Husky and Blackhawk tools as well as making its own economy-grade tools under the None Better and Mustang names. New Britain Machine was then acquired by the Litton Tool Company on December 22, 1972.

== History ==
According to one source, New Britain Machine was founded in New Britain, Connecticut, in 1887. However, according to Archives & Special Collections at the Thomas J. Dodd Research Center, it was founded in 1895 subsequent to the J.T. Case Engine Company, a manufacturer of steam engines. The first product the new company produced was a chainsaw mortising machine. In 1917, it registered the None Better trademark to sell its line of sockets and tools. Much of New Britain Machine's early tool production was done under the None Better line. Many of the early tools were carbon steel, offering a lower cost alternative to the higher price alloy steels of the day. Early tool sets consisted of hex drive sockets and an ell bar for the drive tool. Beginning in the 1930s, the None Better line consisted of a wide variety of 1/2 square drive tools with a Cadmium finish. At this time, New Britain Machine was also supplying tools for Sears in their Craftsman line of tools. These tools are easy to distinguish as they either have a BE or an H in a circle stamped into the tools. The New Britain Machine line was also created at this time as a higher priced alloy steel alternative.

== Acquisitions and development ==
The early 1930s were a busy time for New Britain Machine Company. At the beginning of the decade, New Britain purchased the Husky Wrench Company, which was started by Sigmund Mandl in 1924. Sigmund Mandl went on to Blackhawk Manufacturing Company in 1931 after the Husky Wrench Company was bought by Olsen Manufacturing. During this time, New Britain Machine had a contract with Sears to supply sockets and drive tools for their Craftsman tool line. This contract survived until 1947 when the socket was gradually phased out and replaced by the "V" series sockets. In 1925 the National Automotive Parts Association was formed and New Britain Machine became the main supplier for them until the late 1970s.

In 1955, New Britain bought the hand tool line of Blackhawk Manufacturing Company, which retained its line of hydraulic jacks and other hydraulic products and changed its name to Applied Power Industries. Blackhawk tools became a very important brand for the New Britain Machine Company for many years. Many of the designs that Blackhawk made were adopted by New Britain in their tools. New Britain Machine Company also supplied many companies, this list includes Mac Tools, Matco Tools, Giller, J. C. Penney (Penncraft), Owatonna Tools Company, American Forge, and PowerKraft.

In 1957, Luther Kilness filed patent numbers 2,554,990 and 2,981,389 with the United States Patent Office. This design can be said to be the next evolution of the ratchet design of SK Hand Tools' Theodore Rueb. This ratchet was a very successful design, lasting from its introduction in 1961 to the eventual closure of New Britain in the 1980s. The ratchet was a compression engagement, using 12 teeth with a 60 tooth ratchet count. Later ratchets, from 1971 and onward, used a 9 tooth pawl making the ratchet a 45 tooth count.

In 1972, New Britain Machine Company was acquired by Litton Industrial Products. Litton continued to be the owner of New Britain Machine Company until the latter's closure in 1990. Its assets (including the Blackhawk and Husky trademarks) were acquired by The Stanley Works which continues to use the Blackhawk name for one of its product lines. On July 8, 2004, New Britain Mayor Timothy Stewart announced that twenty-six acres of New Britain Machine's former property on South Street was being sold to two local businesses, Dattco and Guida's, after reaching an agreement.
