= J. H. Williams =

J. H. Williams may refer to:

- J. H. Williams III, American comic artist
- Jim Williams (politician) (1926–2016), American politician
- Lt. Col. J.H. Williams, British author of Elephant Bill (1950)
- John Harry Williams (1908–1966), Canadian-American physicist
- J.H. Williams Tool Group, American tool manufacturer

== See also ==
- Williams (surname)
