= Industrial Scientific Corporation =

American gas detector company

- Type: Subsidiary
- Industry: Personal Protective Equipment
- Founded: 1985; 41 years ago
- Headquarters: Pittsburgh, United States
- Area served: Worldwide
- Products: Gas detectors
- Number of employees: 800
- Parent: Fortive
- Website: www.indsci.com

Industrial Scientific Corporation is an American company headquartered in Pittsburgh, Pennsylvania, that designs and manufactures gas detection products that protect workers from hazardous conditions around the world. Key markets include utilities, chemical production, oil and gas, steel and coke, paper industry, fire service, construction, military, insurance companies, food service, and general industry.

== History ==
Industrial Scientific began in 1976 as the Research Division of the National Mine Service Company (NMS) with a focus on developing instrumentation to detect methane gas. In 1985, NMS sold the division to founder Kenton McElhattan, and Industrial Scientific started its operations as a private company. The catalyst for the separation stemmed from an argument with NMS's Scottish majority owner over a used microscope worth $600.

In 2015, Industrial Scientific moved into a new 200,000 square foot headquarters in Robinson Township, Pennsylvania, consolidating their operations from four buildings in Oakdale, Pennsylvania and Findlay Township, Pennsylvania into one.

In 2017, Industrial Scientific was acquired by Fortive, the parent company of Fluke, Tektronix, among others.

=== Acquisitions ===
In 2006, Industrial Scientific acquired Oldham S.A. of Arras, France, a company primarily manufacturing fixed gas monitoring Systems.

In 2008, Industrial Scientific acquired DBO2, a company using a self developed data mining software to predict and forestall safety problems primarily in the building industry.

In 2019, Industrial Scientific acquired Toronto software company Intelex Technologies, a developer of environmental, health and safety, and quality software.

In 2025, Industrial Scientific acquired Auckland real-time environmental monitoring company Aeroqual.

== Products ==
Industrial Scientific designs and manufactures various styles of intrinsically safe gas detection equipment designed to work as personal protective equipment or as an area monitoring solution. Industrial Scientific also develops a software as a service product called Predictive Solutions.
