= Richard Godwin =

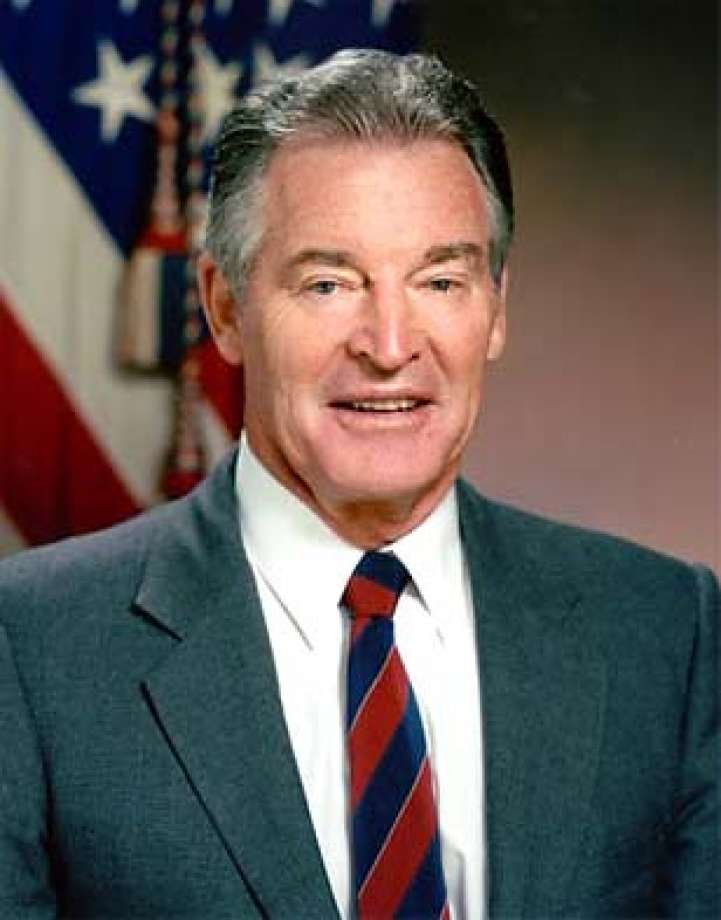

Inaugural Under Secretary of Defense for Acquisition, Technology and Logistics
- In office September 30, 1986 – September 30, 1987
- President: Ronald Reagan
- Preceded by: Position established
- Succeeded by: Robert B. Costello

Personal details
- Born: Richard Philip Godwin; March 21, 1922 Clifton, New Jersey
- Died: March 3, 2005 (aged 82) San Rafael, California
- Spouse: Reatha Lovell Trumbell (1947-2005)
- Children: 4
- Education: Yale University

Richard Philip Godwin (March 21, 1922 – March 3, 2005) also known as Dick, was born in Clifton, New Jersey, but raised in New Britain, Connecticut. Served in the United States Navy during WWII, enlisted July 1, 1943, and discharged June 21, 1946. He received a bachelor's degree in Engineering from Yale in 1945. He worked at New Britain Machine Company in grade school and went on to become chief metallurgist and machine tool designer. He worked for the Atomic Energy Commission and was a Nuclear Engineer and Project Director for the NS Savannah, the world's first nuclear-powered merchant vessel. In 1961, Richard started his career at Bechtel, where he would serve in many positions. He was elected vice president of Bechtel in 1971 and director in 1976. Godwin left Bechtel in 1986 serve as the first Under Secretary for Acquisition, Technology and Logistics at The Pentagon. In 1988, he resigned unsatisfied with what he was capable of doing. In the 90’s he dabbled in Broadway, producing two successful musicals “Crazy For You” (1992) and “Kiss Me, Kate” (1999). He opened a Vineyard in Northern California where he retired producing award-winning ‘Godwin’ wine.

== Personal life ==
Richard Godwin was born to Paul Stilson Godwin and Leila Frances Gatter Godwin, the middle child with an older brother Paul and a younger sister Ruth. In grade school he worked at New Britain Machine Company with his brother, and went on to become chief metallurgist. Paul graduated from New Britain High School in 1939 and Richard graduated in 1940.

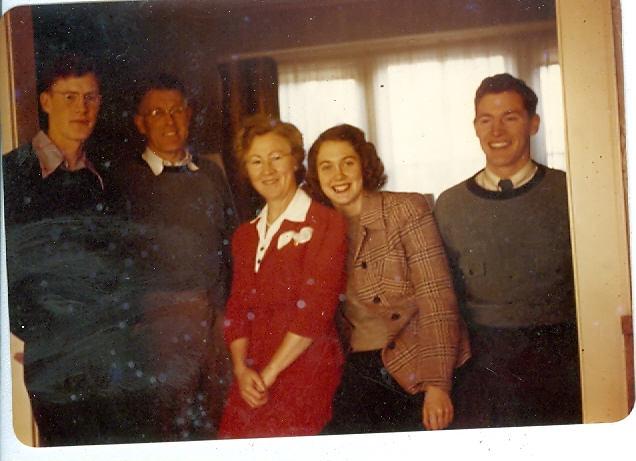

After the war, he married Reatha Lovell Trumbell on October 4, 1947. They went on to have four children.

== Career ==
=== Military ===
Was in the Navy during WWII, Originally in the V-12 Navy College Training Program and then an engineering and commanding officer of escort and landing ships in the Pacific Theatre.

=== Yale & becoming a Nuclear Engineer ===
Graduated from Yale University with a bachelor's degree in Engineering in 1945. He moved to Washington, D.C. to become a reactor engineer for the United States Atomic Energy Commission. In 1953 he was sent to Livermore, California to develop and test the first thermonuclear weapons. In 1956, he was called back to Washington to work on the NS Savannah as Project Director.

=== Bechtel ===
In 1961, Godwin was hired at Bechtel and moved his family to California. At Bechtel, Godwin held a plethora of positions, starting as an executive engineer, then manager scientific development department from 1962 to 1965, executive assistant to the chairman, Bechtel Group of Companies from 1965 to 1967, manager research and scientific development, corporate planning, executive services, and computer departments from 1967 to 1971, elected vice president Bechtel, Inc., and manager of division operations in the hydro and community facilities division from 1971 to 1973, deputy division manager and division manager from 1974 to 1976, Director Bechtel Group, Inc. from 1976 to 1978, senior vice president from 1978 to 1979, and executive Vice President and member of the executive committee from 1979 to 1980. Among the many accomplishments for which he was responsible at Bechtel was the development of Jubail Industrial City in Saudi Arabia.

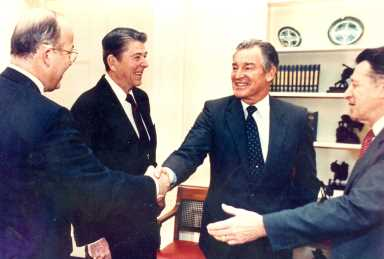
Richard P. Godwin with President Ronald Reagan and Secretary of Defense Caspar Weinberger

=== Department of Defense ===
When news surfaced that The Pentagon was paying vastly inflated prices for spare parts & everyday items as toilet seats, nails, and hammers. Hewlett-Packard chairman David Packard was tasked by President Ronald Reagan to head a commission to look into the situation. The panel found that there was a big problem. A statute was created by Congress asking for single bureaucrat responsible for what the Pentagon orders. They believed that under a centralized system various chiefs of each branch of the service would lose their authority to decide what weapons systems would be purchased. In 1986, President Ronald Reagan selected Richard Godwin to become the first Under Secretary of Defense for Acquisition, Technology and Logistics third-ranking official in the department under Defense Secretary Caspar Weinberger, also a former Bechtel executive, and Deputy Secretary William Howard Taft IV. Richards simple goal of employing commercial business practices instead of military or bureaucratic ones to improve and simplify acquisitions turned out to be fruitless. A year later he resigned, stating his superiors Weinberger & Taft didn’t give any executive powers beyond being able to “Sign a Paper”. Most of the Packard Commission reforms he pushed were eventually enacted.

=== Broadway ===
Godwin was executive producer of two successful Broadway musical revivals: “Crazy For You” (1992), which won a Tony & Olivier Award, and “Kiss Me, Kate” (1999) which won Tonys and Oliviers awards as well.

=== Vineyard ===
Godwin retired to Healdsburg, California in 1988 where he converted his 40-acre (16 ha) ranch into a vineyard and winery where they sell an assortment of Godwin Wines.
