= Great Neck Saw =

American hand tool company

GreatNeckTools, Inc.
- Type: Private
- Industry: Manufacturing
- Founded: 1919 in Pittsfield, Massachusetts
- Founder: Samuel Jacoff
- Headquarters: Memphis, Tennessee
- Key people: James W.W. Saunders (CEO)
- Products: Hand tools
- Number of employees: 700
- Website: www.greatnecksaw.com

GreatNeckTools (formally Great Neck Saw Manufacturing, Inc.) is an American company that manufactures and distributes hand tools, including wrenches, screwdrivers, hammers, chisels, and automotive specialty tools. The company is the largest privately owned tool manufacturer in the United States.

The GreatNeckTools portfolio includes brands such as GreatNeck, OEMTOOLS, Sheffield, Mayes, BuckBros, and STAK, as well as private label brands such as Husky and Kobalt.

== History ==
In 1919, Samuel Jacoff started a business in Pittsfield, Massachusetts manufacturing hacksaw blades. In 1929, he merged his business with Great Neck Manufacturing, another blade manufacturer.

In 1941, they purchased a handsaw company and constructed a new plant in Mineola, NY where they remain today. By 1971, Sam and his four sons built GreatNeck in to a major force in the hand tool business by purchasing Buck Bros., a Massachusetts chisel company, and Mayes Brothers, a level company from Tennessee. They also added a plastic extrusion plant.

In 2024, the name of the company officially changed from Great Neck Saw Manufacturing, Inc. to GreatNeckTools, Inc.

In 2025, GreatNeckTools launched the STAK knife and tool brand. The company also moved its headquarters from Mineola, NY to Memphis, TN.

Today, GreatNeck is a global supplier to the hardware, home improvement, sporting good, mass retail and automotive markets, and have distribution and manufacturing facilities around the world.

== Gallery ==
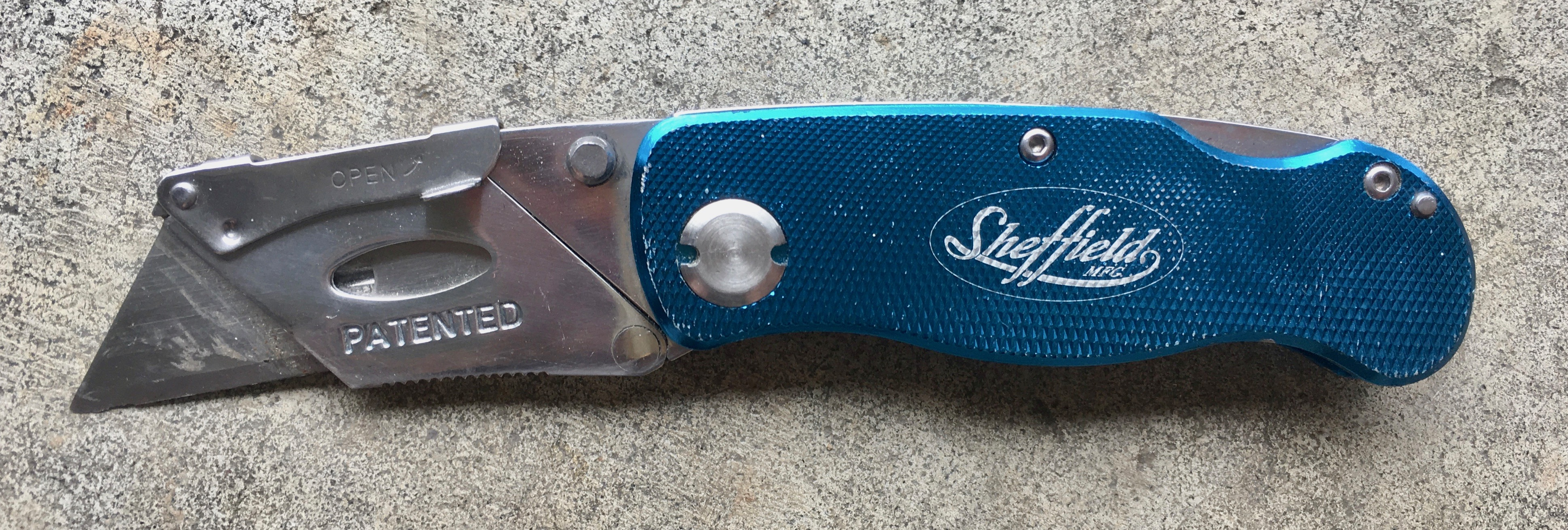
A Sheffield brand utility knife.
