= Teletrac =

SAAS corporation

Teletrac Navman
- Formerly: Trafficmaster
- Type: Subsidiary of Vontier
- Industry: Global Positioning System
- Headquarters: Garden Grove, California, U.S.
- Area served: Global
- Parent: Vontier
- Website: www.teletracnavman.com

Teletrac (branded as Teletrac Navman; formerly Trafficmaster) is a telematics software as a service company headquartered in Southern California, with offices in the United Kingdom, Australia, New Zealand, and Mexico. It provides cloud-based GPS fleet tracking software, stolen vehicle tracking and connected services such as eCall, bCall and Concierge and is a subsidiary of Vontier.

== History ==
Teletrac was founded as International Teletrac Systems in 1988. It received initial funding from a unit of AirTouch Communication (formerly known as Pacific Telesis) in exchange for 49% equity of the company. Teletrac launched two service offerings in 1990 for its flagship Los Angeles market: a consumer service called "Stolen Vehicle Location Services" and a fleet/enterprise service called "Corporate Vehicle Location services". Los Angeles was followed by Detroit, Miami, Dallas, Chicago, and Houston.

In 1991, following the lifting of information services restrictions from the AT&T consent decree, AirTouch increased its equity stake and the company became known as AirTouch Teletrac.

Teletrac was purchased from Airtouch in 1996 by James McQueen and its headquarters were moved to Kansas City, MO.

=== Trafficmaster ===
Founded in the United Kingdom in 1988 by entrepreneurs David Martell and Ian Williams, Trafficmaster provided road congestion information to drivers, using a network of sensors on major roads. The company was floated on the London Stock Exchange in 1994 and expanded into Germany and other countries; it added Fleet management and stolen vehicle tracking to its services. By 2000, during the dot.com bubble, the company was valued at £650 million and had partnerships with several car manufacturers.

In 2001, Trafficmaster purchased Teletrac in order to expand into the United States. The Teletrac brand was retained for the subsidiary. In early 2002, the company pulled out of the fleet management market in Europe after issuing two profit warnings.

=== Vector Capital ===
Trafficmaster plc was purchased by private equity firm Vector Capital in 2010, in a deal valued at $145 million. The company was taken private after the purchase. Prior to the purchase, the bulk of Trafficmaster's income came from its operations in the United States.

=== Danaher / Fortive / Vontier ===
In 2013, Vector Capital sold Teletrac to American conglomerate Danaher Corporation; it was reported that Vector made three-times return with the sale. Teletrac was among the businesses spun off in 2016 to create Fortive, and in 2020 Fortive split out its transportation businesses to create Vontier.

=== Navman ===
Teletrac merged in 2015 with Taiwan-owned Navman Wireless, a maker of GPS navigation devices, and the resulting company was headquartered in Glenview, IL.

In 2016, the company rebranded as Teletrac Navman and the UK company was renamed from Trafficmaster Limited to Teletrac Navman (UK) Ltd.

== Products ==
The company's initial product was stolen vehicle location and corporate fleet vehicle location, using a technique called Time Difference of Arrival (TDoA) Multilateration. Specialized base stations and receivers were installed throughout a city, and vehicles equipped with special transmitters could have their location determined on command. Once GPS receivers became affordable, Teletrac discontinued its network-based positioning system and began offering products and services centered around a cloud-based GPS tracking platform. The platform is used for applications including stolen vehicle tracking, monitoring fuel consumption, and basic GPS vehicle tracking. It includes features for driver log and regulatory compliance with EOBR and the FMCSA, and is scalable for tracking individual vehicles or large fleets.

Teletrac Navman diversified into connected services in 2020, providing cloud-based TCU connectivity to brands in the UK, Europe, United States and Australasia such as Ford, Jaguar and Land Rover.
