= Vontier =

U.S. information technology company

Vontier Corporation
- Type: Public company
- Traded as: NYSE: VNT; S&P 400 component
- Headquarters: Raleigh, North Carolina, U.S.
- Key people: Karen Francis, Chairman; Mark Morelli, President and CEO
- Revenue: ▲US$3.08 billion (2025)
- Net income: ▼US$406 million (2025)
- Number of employees: 8,400 (2020)
- Subsidiaries: Gilbarco Veeder-Root; Matco Tools; Teletrac
- Website: vontier.com

Vontier Corporation is an industrial manufacturing company headquartered in Raleigh, North Carolina. It owns the brands Gilbarco Veeder-Root, Matco Tools and Teletrac Navman, including subsidiaries Hennessy Industries, Gasboy, and Global Traffic Technologies.

== History ==
In October 2020, Fortive completed the corporate spin-off of 80% of Vontier. Fortive disposed of its remaining 20% ownership interest in January 2021.
