= Sigmund Mandl =

Founder of the Husky Wrench manufacturing company

Sigmund S. Mandl (1898–1976) was the founder of the Husky Wrench manufacturing company. His brother Hugo was born in Úsov.

On January 29, 1924, he founded Husky Wrench in Milwaukee, Wisconsin, with two partners, at about the time he filed his first patent. After selling the business Mandl went to Blackhawk Manufacturing in 1931, and became one of their two chief design engineers. Later, he was General Manager of Die-Mold Corporation, while continuing to hold his position at Blackhawk.

Mandl received a number of patents for tool design, including:

- US 1,614,039 S. Mandl Filed 02/01/1924, Issued 01/11/1927. Ratchet Wrench (e.g., Husky 1/2-Drive No. 1 Ratchet)
- US 1,628,467 S. Mandl Filed 12/22/1924, Issued 05/10/1927. Ratchet Wrench (e.g., Husky 1/2-Drive No. 1 Ratchet)
- US 1,724,491 S. Mandl Filed Filed 07/26/1926, Issued 08/13/1929. Socket Wrench with Storage Handle
- US 1,775,402 S. Mandl Filed 01/26/1925. Issued 09/09/1930. Socket Wrench and Extension Set (e.g., Husky No. 986 Socket Set)

A monument was dedicated in his memory in Milwaukee's Agudas Achim Cemetery, August 7, 1988.
