= Kobalt (tools) =

Brand of tools

- Product type: Hand and mechanics' tools, power tools, and tool storage
- Current owner: Lowe's Companies, Inc.
- Country: United States
- Introduced: 1998; 28 years ago
- Markets: United States, Mexico, Canada
- Website: www.kobalt.com

Kobalt is a line of hand and mechanics' tools, power tools, and tool storage products owned by the American home improvement chain Lowe's. It is the house brand for both Lowe's in North America and their joint venture with the now defunct Masters Home Improvement in Australia.

== History ==
Kobalt's original logo, used from 1998 to 2016

Lowe's and manufacturing partner J.H. Williams launched Kobalt in 1998, with the intention of competing against rival retailers Sears and The Home Depot and their respective Craftsman and Husky tool brands.

In 2003, the Danaher Corporation began producing the majority of Kobalt hand tools.

In 2011, Lowe's ended its arrangement with Danaher and switched to a different supplier for its mechanic's hand tools, JS Products of Las Vegas, Nevada. Screwdrivers continue to be supplied by Great Neck. The same year, the Kobalt line expanded to include cordless power tools, manufactured by Chervon. The current (2020) miter saws are manufactured by Rexon Industrial Corp. Taiwan. In 2019 Lowe's announced that they will launch the Kobalt XTR power tools .

== Budget brands ==
Blue Hawk logo

Lowe's has two brands of tools and supplies positioned below Kobalt in quality and cost: Project Source and the more recent Blue Hawk, introduced in 2009.

== Gallery ==
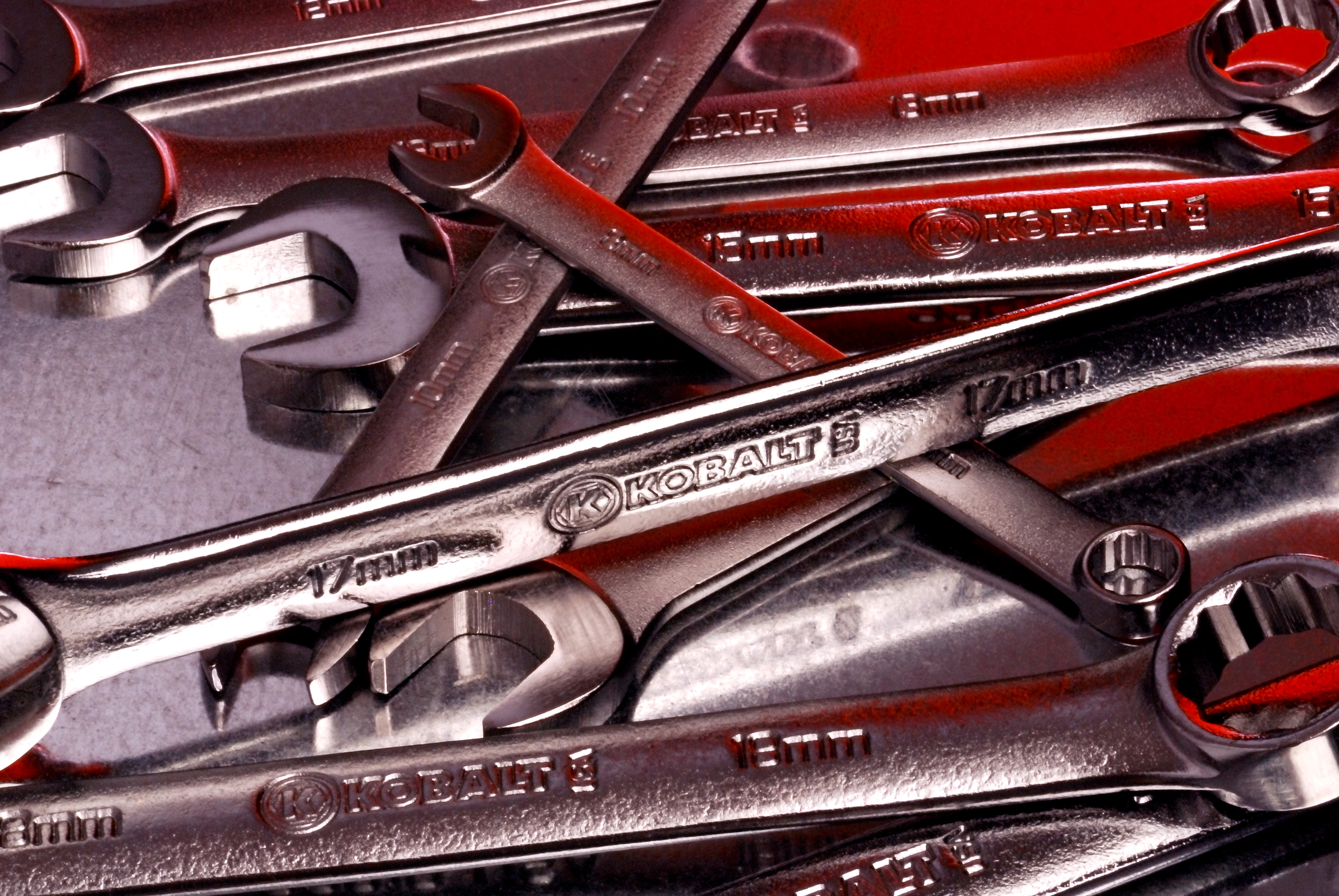
An assortment of Kobalt combination wrenches, manufactured by Danaher.

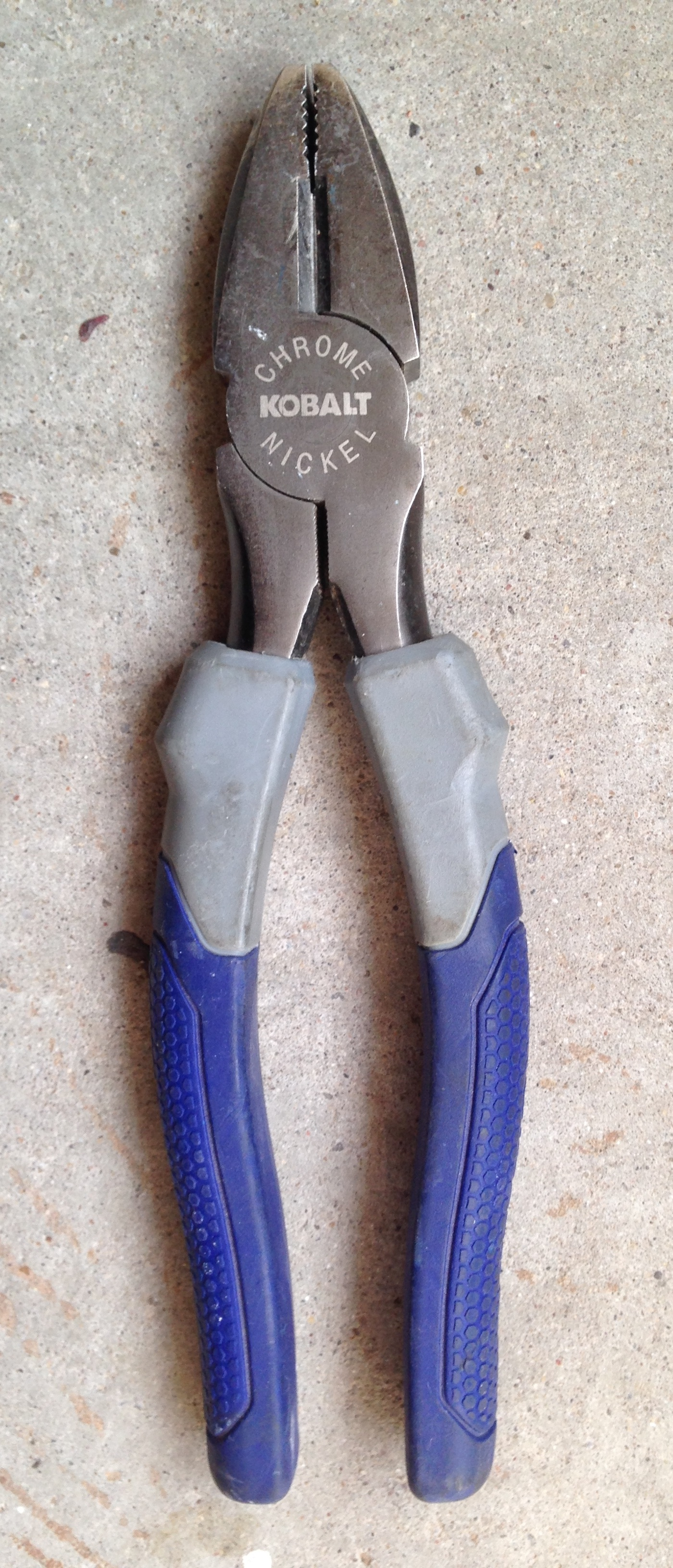
A pair of Kobalt lineman's pliers.

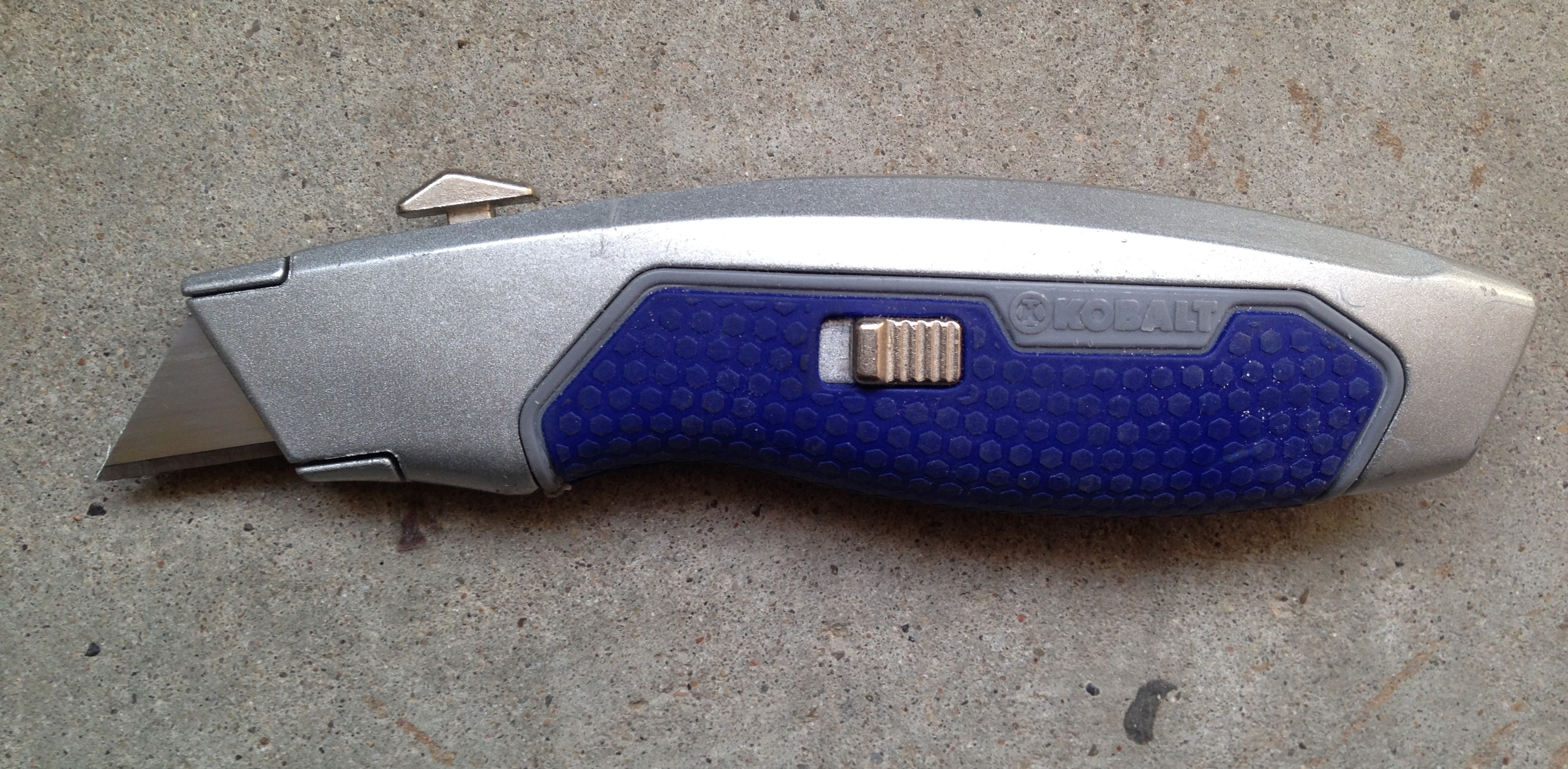
A Kobalt utility knife.
