= Husky (tool brand) =

Brand of tools

- Product type: Subsidiary
- Current owner: The Home Depot
- Country: United States
- Introduced: 1924
- Previous owners: The Stanley Works, National Hand Tool, Litton Industries, New Britain Machine Company, Olsen Manufacturing Company, Husky Wrench Company
- Website: www.homedepot.com

Husky is a line of hand tools, pneumatic tools, and tool storage products. Though founded in 1924, it is now best known as the house brand of The Home Depot, where it is exclusively sold. Its hand tools are manufactured for Home Depot by Western Forge, Apex Tool Group, CSPS and Iron Bridge Tools. Its slogan is "The toughest name in tools." Home Depot also carries a higher end line of tools marked Husky Pro.

All Husky hand tools have a lifetime warranty. In the past, Home Depot had a program offering consumers an exchange of their broken Sears Craftsman or other brand of hand tool for a comparable Husky tool at no charge. This program has since been discontinued.

== History ==
Husky Wrench was founded in Milwaukee, Wisconsin, on January 29, 1924, by Sigmund Mandl, who had immigrated to the United States from Czechoslovakia. By 1928, Husky had established a significant collaboration with the J.H. Williams Tool Group, with Williams distributing Husky wrenches in its mechanic's tool sets.

In January 1929, the Husky name was sold to the Olsen Manufacturing Company of Kenosha, Wisconsin. The company relocated to Kenosha and changed its name to the Husky Corporation. Mandl went on to work for Blackhawk Manufacturing of Milwaukee.

Sometime before 1932, the Husky name was again sold, this time to the New Britain Machine Company of New Britain, Connecticut, which was purchased by Litton Industries in the 1970s. When Litton dissolved its hand tools division in the 1980s, it sold the Husky brand (and other assets, including the Blackhawk brand) to National Hand Tool.

The Stanley Works acquired the Husky brand with its acquisition in 1986 of National Hand Tool. In October 1992, Stanley began supplying the Husky brand exclusively to The Home Depot, and sometime later transferred the rights to the name to Home Depot.

== Budget brands ==
HDX logo.

Home Depot's Workforce brand of tools was a budget brand slotted below Husky in quality and cost. It has largely been phased out and replaced by the HDX brand of tools and supplies, introduced in 2012. These brands do not have lifetime warranties as Husky tools do.

== Gallery ==
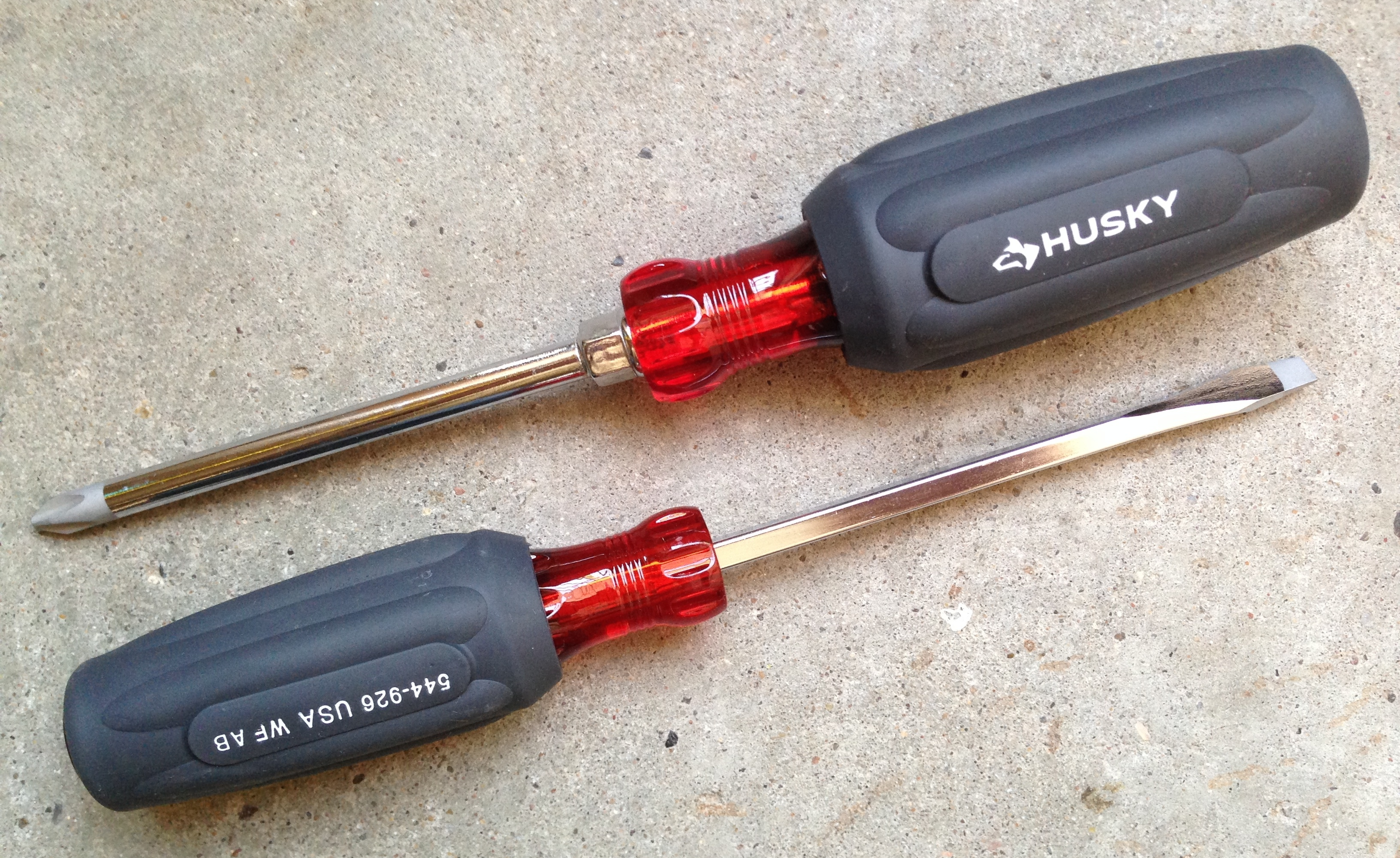
Husky Pro screwdrivers.

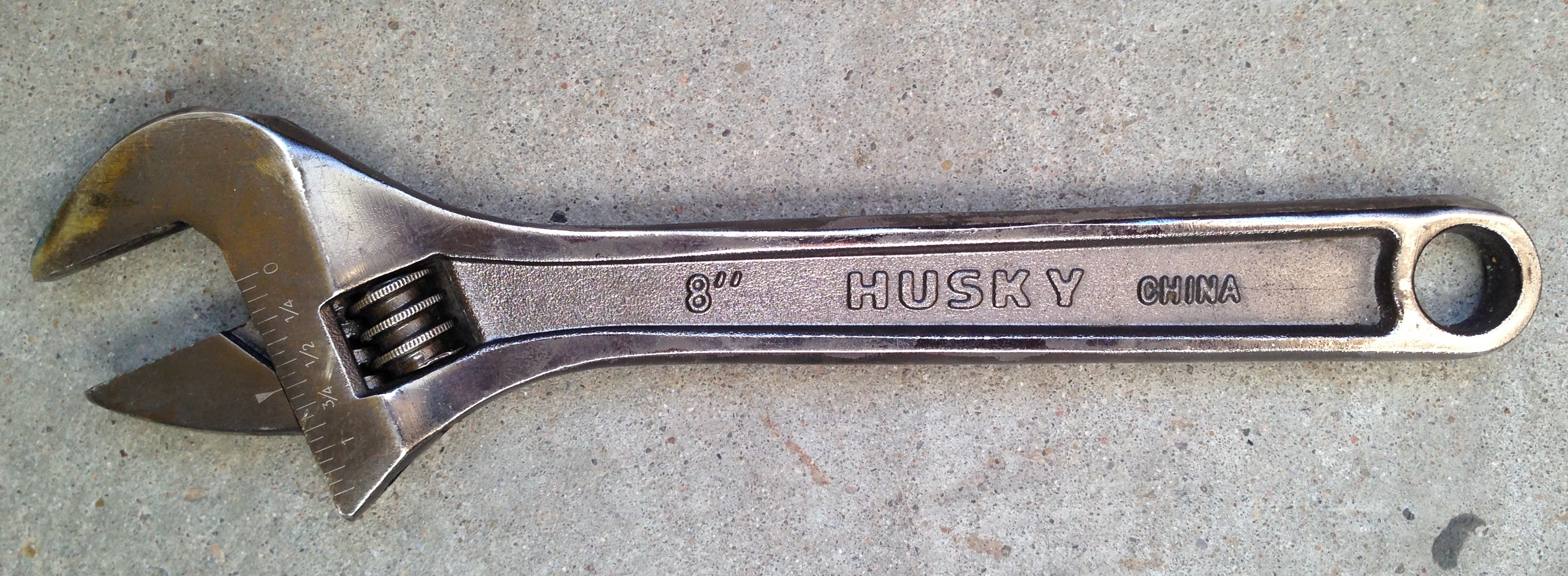
A modern Husky adjustable wrench.

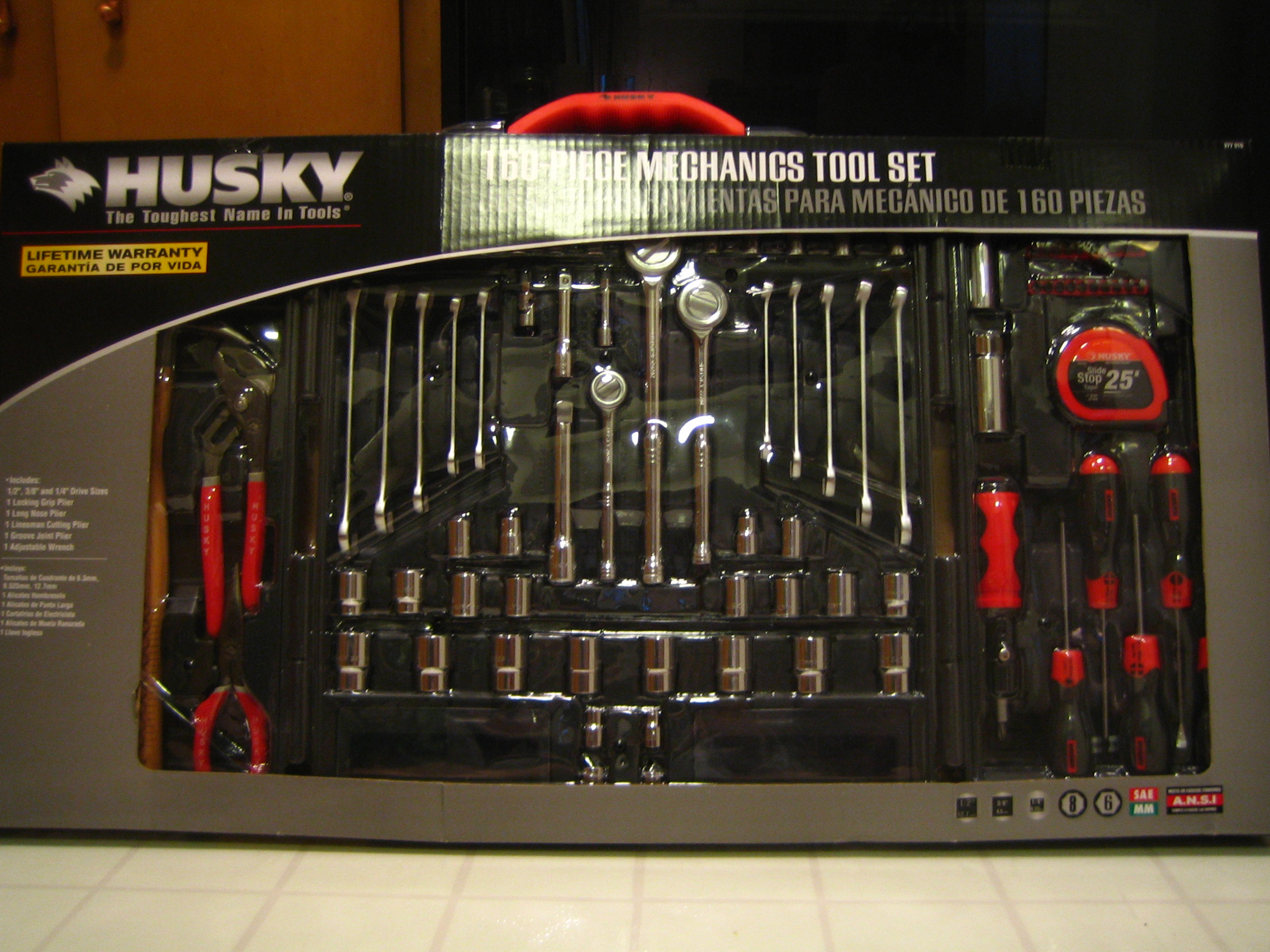
Modern, economy toolset made for Home Depot by Iron Bridge Tool Works.

== See also ==
- Craftsman and Kobalt—Husky's primary retail competition
- Mastercraft—Canadian Tire's tool brand
