= Cornwell Tools =

American tool manufacturing company

Cornwell Quality Tools
- Type: Private
- Industry: Manufacturing
- Founded: 1919 in Cuyahoga Falls, Ohio
- Headquarters: Wadsworth, Ohio
- Products: Professional hand tools
- Website: www.cornwelltools.com

Cornwell Quality Tools is an American privately held company manufacturing tools for the automotive and aviation industries. The company is currently based in Wadsworth, Ohio. Cornwell remains as one of two remaining mobile tool companies that still produce their own hand tools in house at their Albion, Pennsylvania foundry and Mogadore, Ohio machining plants. USA sourced steel is used at these locations to create a more consistent, better quality product than that of overseas manufacturers. They also carry a lifetime warranty on all hand tools and use Taiwan and China manufacturing to round out its product offerings. Cornwell recently acquired Kennedy Manufacturing, Van Wert, Ohio. Kennedy produces their own Kennedy branded line of tool storage products. Cornwell also carries various air, cordless electric, diagnostic, and hand tools from other manufacturers. This is the same practice as Mac Tools, Snap-on, and Matco Tools, who together make up the four major flags of the mobile tool business.

The company was founded in 1919 by Eugene Cornwell, a blacksmith from Cuyahoga Falls, Ohio.

Cornwell Tools are sold by local tool distributors who own a territory by means of a franchise. The franchise owner drives to the work locations of potential customers, and typically offers financing to individuals buying their tools. Cornwell trucks are typically white with large blue and black Cornwell Ironman logos on their sides.

Cornwell was sued for fraud in a class action lawsuit by 8 former Cornwell Dealers in Bacharach v. Cornwell Quality Tool Co.

== Ratings and reviews ==
The Better Business Bureau of Akron Ohio where Cornwell Quality Tool Co. is headquartered gives the company an A− Grade (as of January 2015).
