= Fluke Corporation =

American manufacturer of electronic test equipment

- Type: Subsidiary
- Industry: Industrial Test Products
- Founded: 1948 in Springdale, Connecticut, U.S.
- Founder: John Fluke Sr.
- Headquarters: Everett, Washington
- Key people: Parker Burke (President)
- Number of employees: 2,525 (as of May 2016)
- Parent: Fortive
- Website: www.fluke.com

Fluke Corporation is an American manufacturer of industrial test, measurement, and diagnostic equipment, including electronic test equipment. It was started in 1948 by John Fluke, Sr in Springdale Connecticut.

== History ==
John Fluke founded Fluke Corporation in June 1948 as the John Fluke Engineering Company, Inc., producing electrical test and measurement equipment. In November 1952, John Fluke moved the company to Seattle Washington, reincorporated as John Fluke Manufacturing Co., Inc. In 1959, the company raised outside capital with an OTC listing. The company then re-listed on the American Stock Exchange (symbol FLK) in 1967. In 1980 the company re-listed on the NYSE (symbol FKM).

In 1987, Fluke established a joint venture with the Test and Measurement subsidiary of North American Philips. The joint venture developed the 'Scopemeter', an instrument combining features of an oscilloscope and a multimeter. Fluke purchased the Test and Measurement subsidiary of Philips in 1993 for $41.8 million. The Philips PM series of measurement instruments was rebranded as Fluke.

Fluke was acquired by the Danaher Corporation in 1998. Danaher spun off several subsidiaries, including Fluke, in 2016 to create Fortive, Inc. (NYSE symbol FTV).

=== Purchase of DNI Nevada ===
In 2002, Fluke purchased DNI Nevada (formerly Dynatech Nevada/Neurodyne-Dempsey), a Carson City, Nevada based manufacturer of medical test equipment, best known for being the original makers of the FitTester 3000 quantitative respirator fit test machine. Fluke subsequently placed DNI Nevada under the Fluke Biomedical brand, and moved manufacturing to its Everett headquarters in 2004.

== Subsidiaries ==
=== Pomona Electronics ===
Pomona Electronics is a company specializing in electronic test equipment and accessories. It was founded in 1951 by Joseph J. and Carl W. Musarra, who were brothers. Founded to manufacture test cable harnesses for examining television cathode-ray tubes. the company started in a factory location around the size of a living room. By 1976, it was owned by ITT Industries, which in 1999 sold it to Fluke. In 2002, Pomona Electronics relocated its manufacturing facility to Everett, Washington.

== Gallery ==
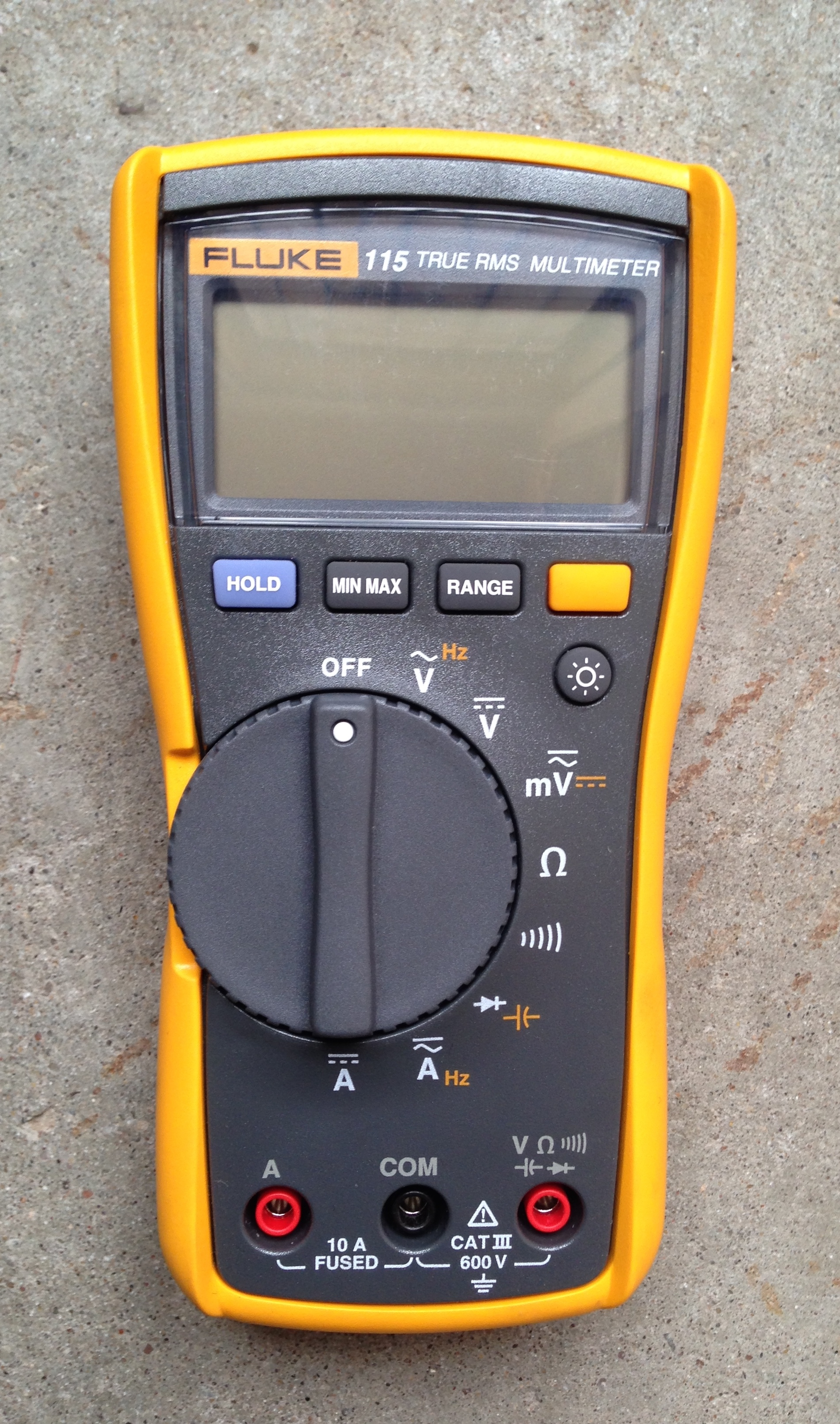
A Fluke 115 multimeter

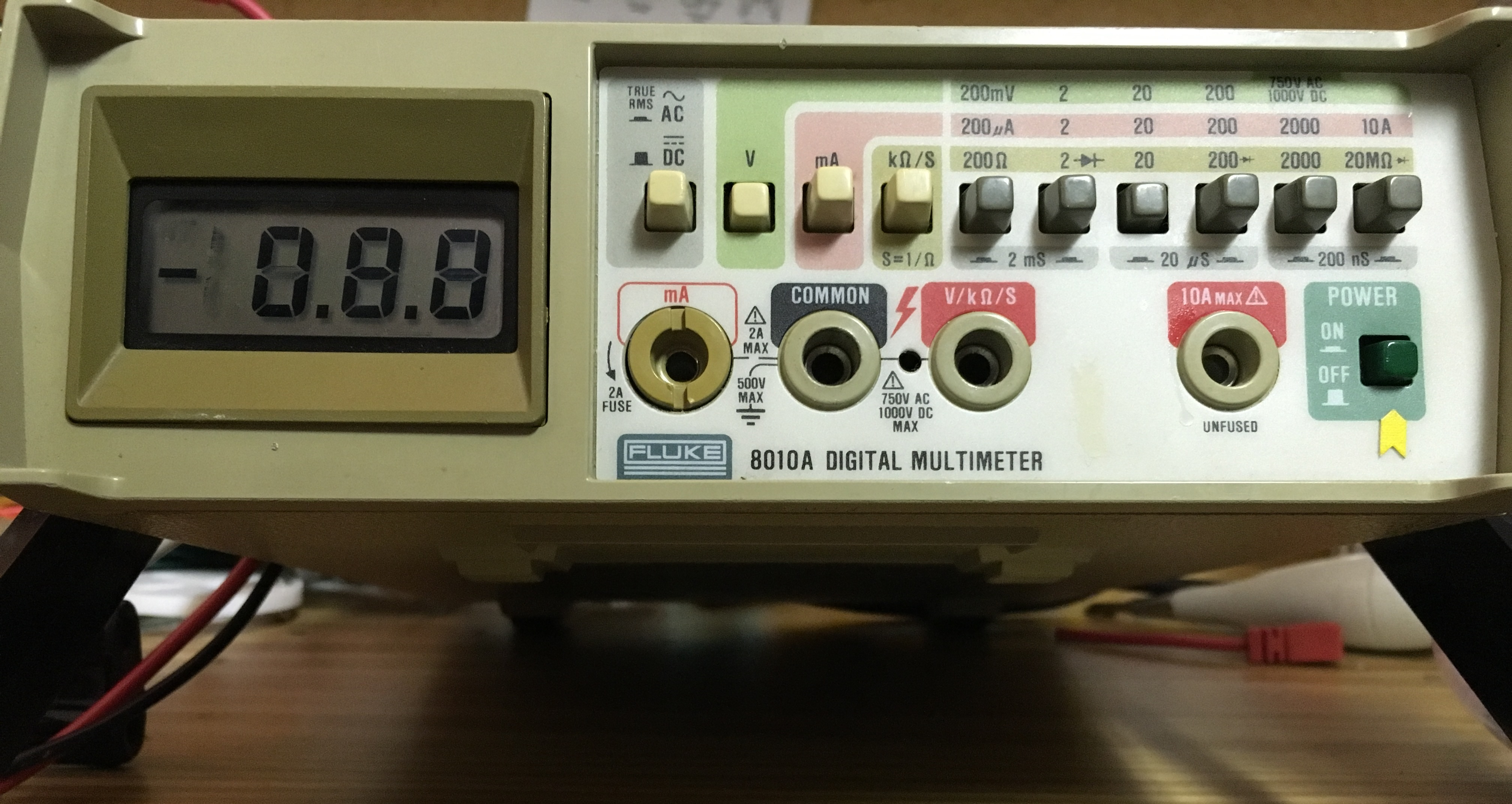
A Fluke 8010a bench multimeter

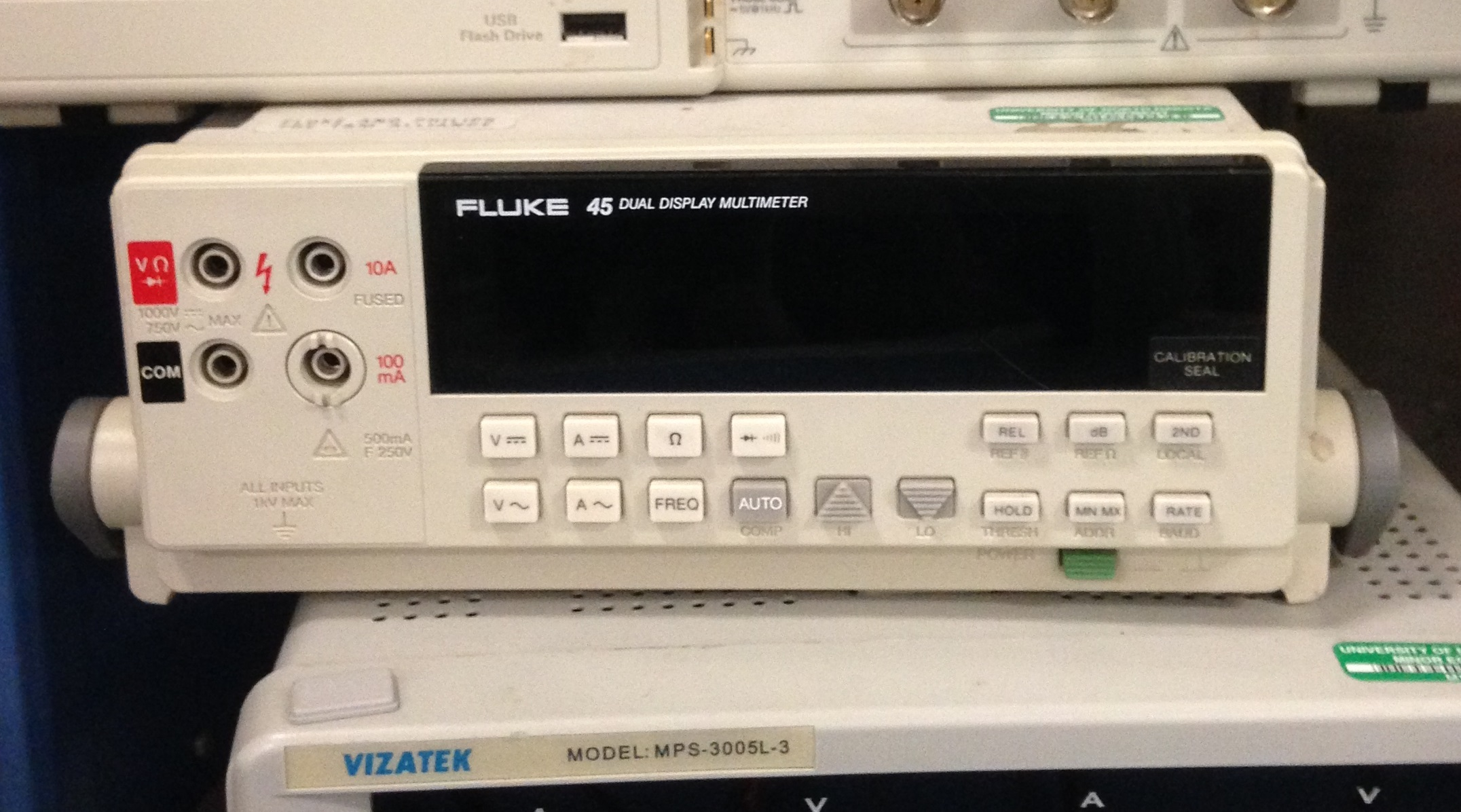
A Fluke 45 Dual Display bench multimeter

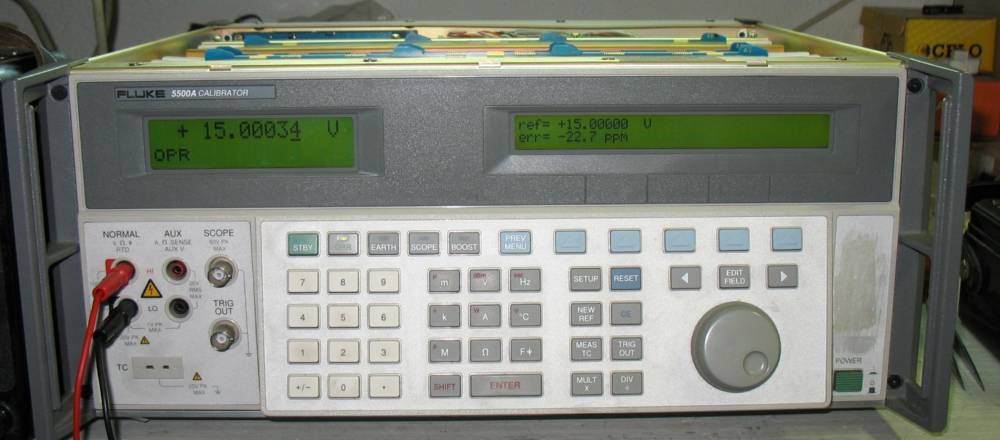
A Fluke 5500 calibrator

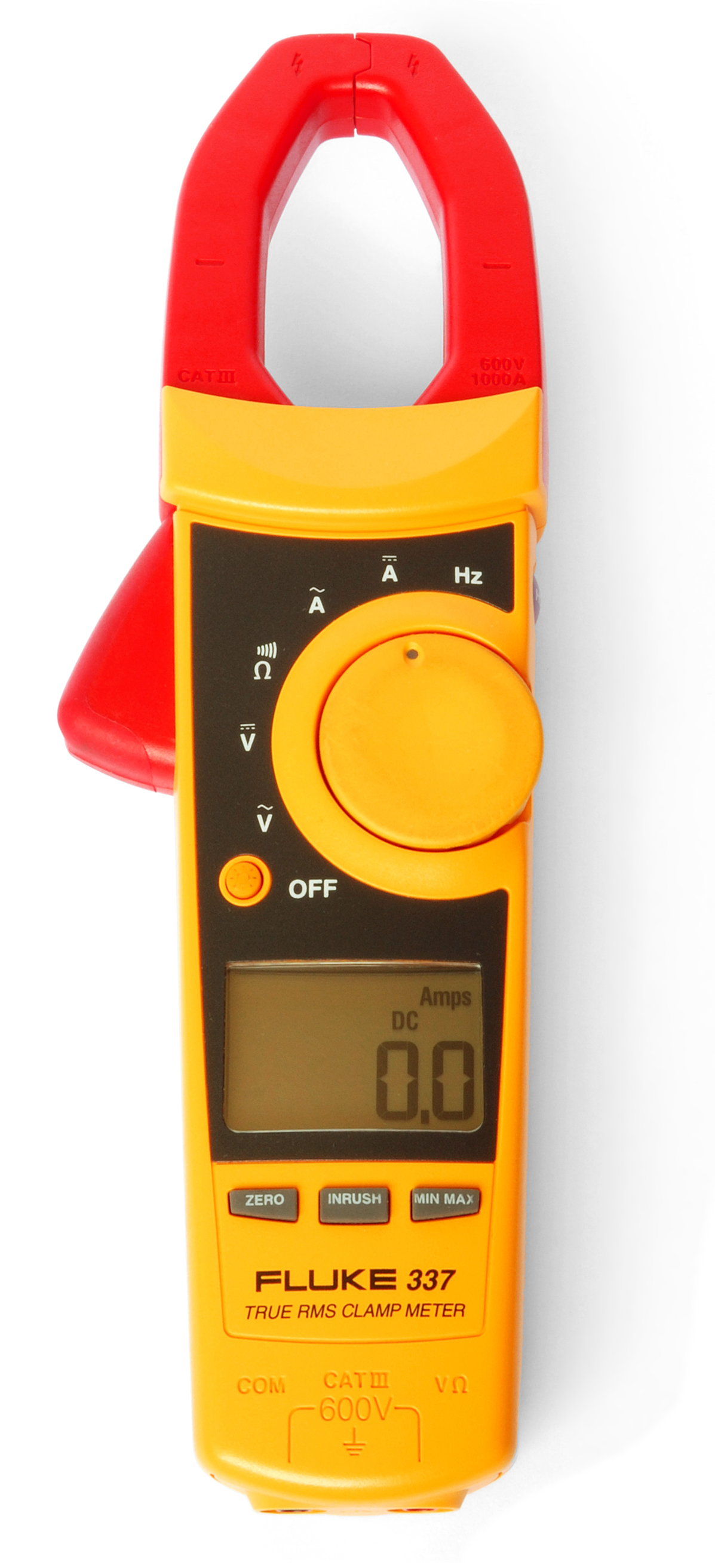
A Fluke 337 clamp multimeter

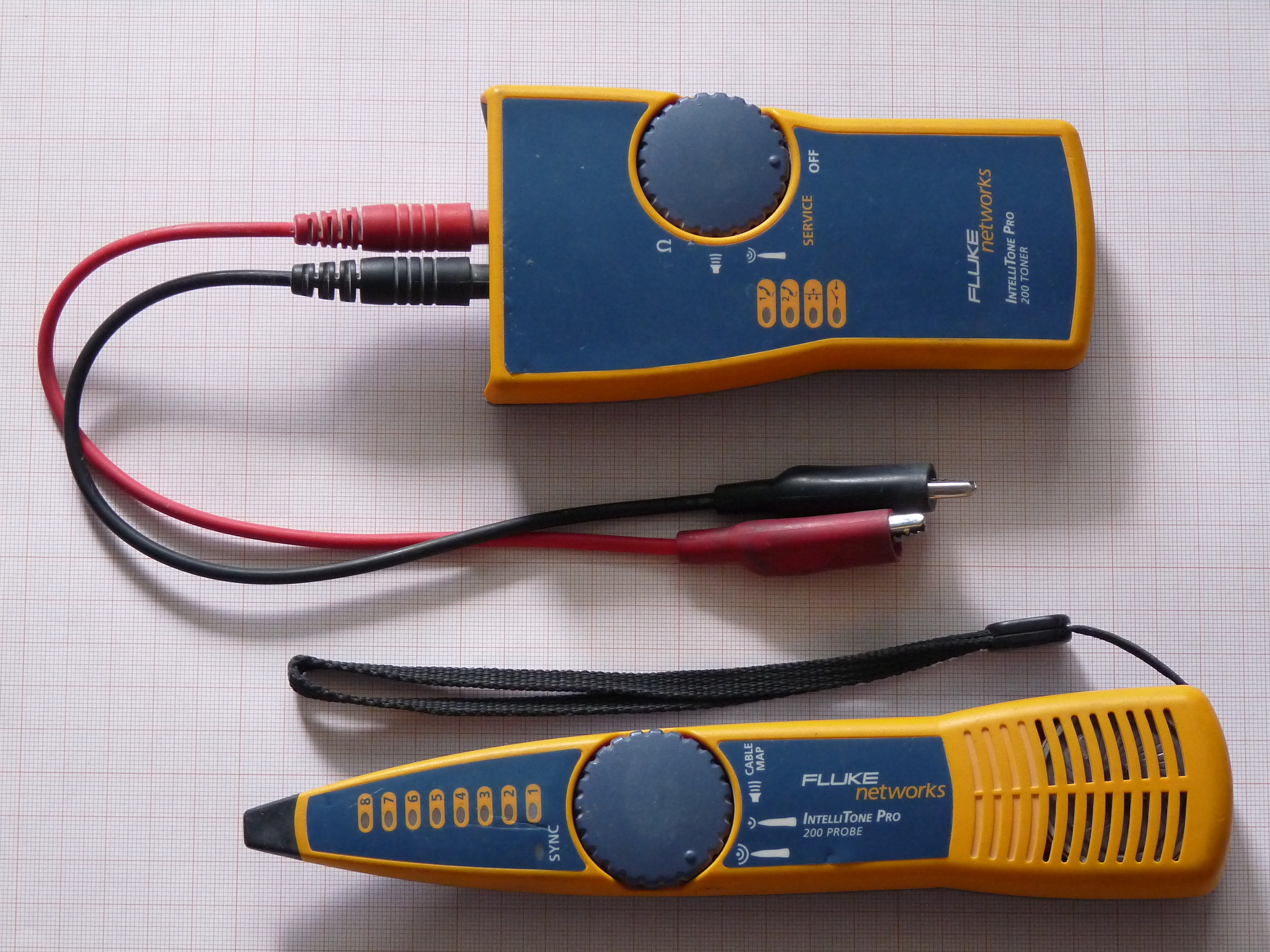
The Fluke Networks IntelliTone Pro LAN probing kit

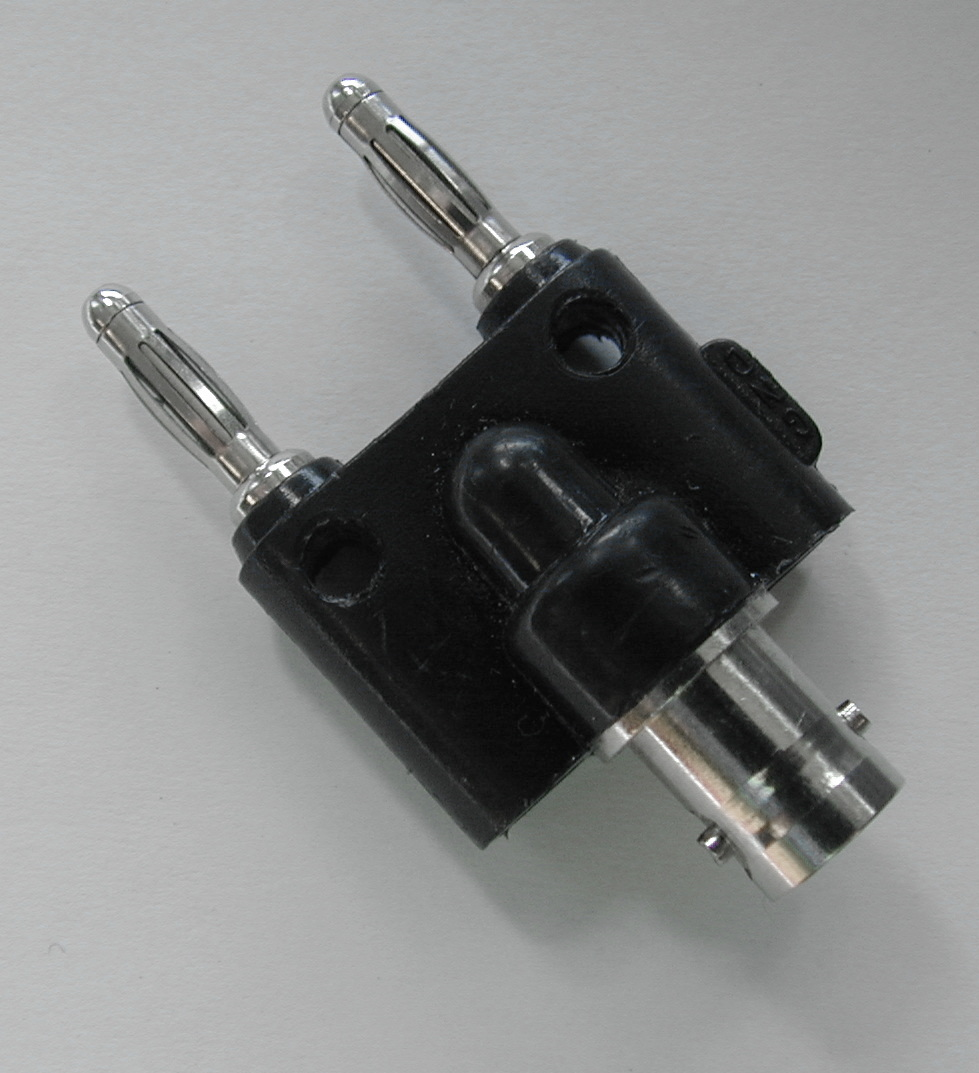
Adapter between a female BNC connector and banana plugs manufactured by Pomona.

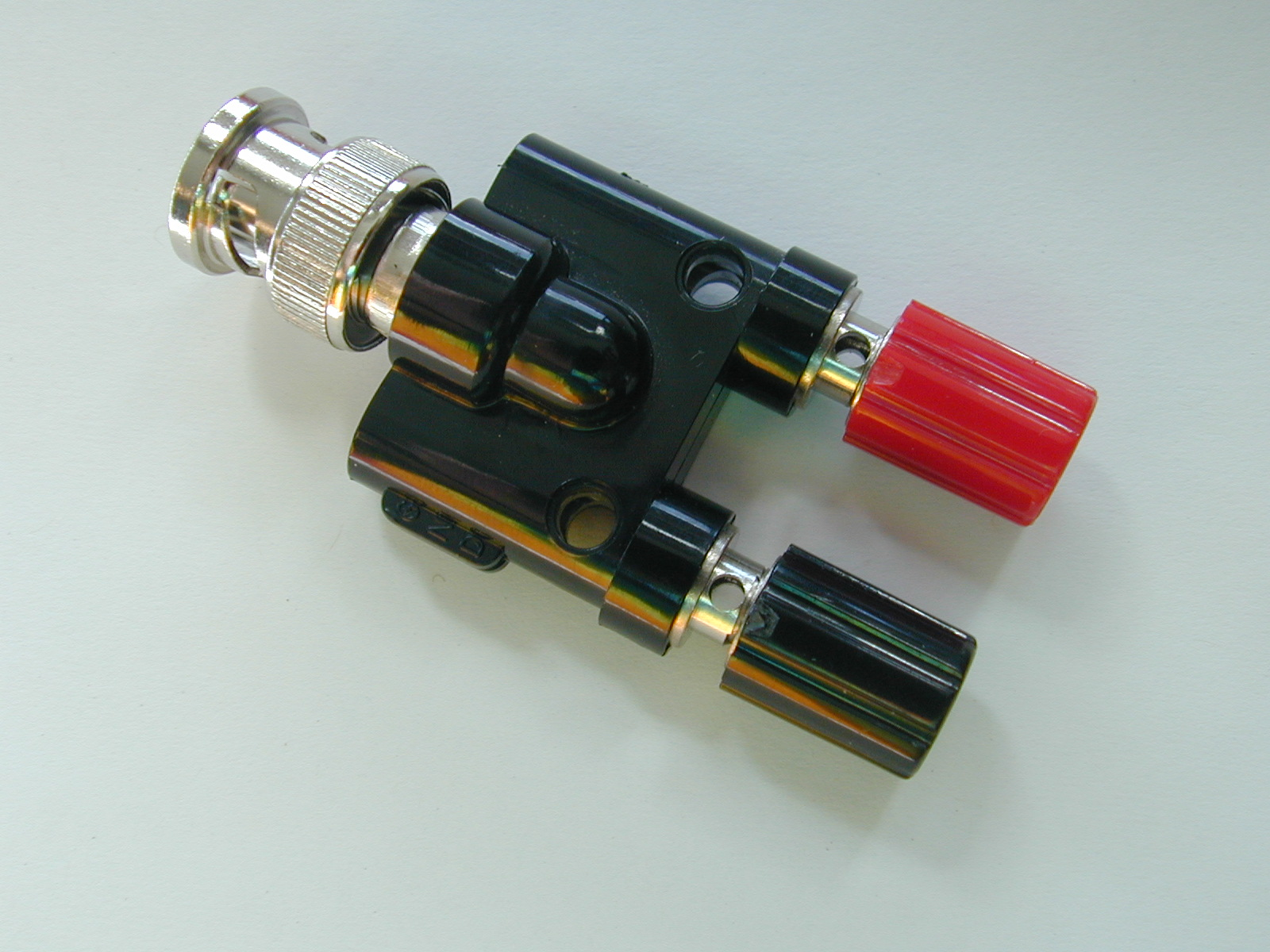
Adapter between five-way binding posts and a male BNC connector manufactured by Pomona.
