= Matco Tools =

American professional tool distributor

- Type: Subsidiary of Vontier
- Industry: Manufacturing
- Founded: 1946; 80 years ago
- Headquarters: Stow, Ohio, U.S.
- Key people: Mike Dwyer (President)
- Products: Professional hand tools
- Parent: Vontier
- Website: www.matcotools.com

Matco Tools, Inc. is an American professional tool distribution franchise for the automotive and other industries and is based in Stow, Ohio, United States. This includes over 13,000 different tools such as wrenches, screw drivers, gauges, and specialty tools. Matco produces their own line of toolboxes in their Lakewood, New York, manufacturing plant. They manufacture and contract the production of many air tools, electric tools, hand tools and diagnostic tools. The company was founded by Bill Mattison and Joe Cornwell. They combined their names to form the company's name, Matco, in 1946 and began selling direct to professional mechanics in 1979. Originally Matco was the box manufacturing division of Mac Tools. However, they have not been associated with Mac since Matco Tools was formed in 1979. The former corporate owner, Danaher, spun off several subsidiaries, including Matco, in 2016 to create Fortive. Fortive, in turn, spun off Matco and other brands as Vontier in 2020.

== Distribution ==
Similar to Snap-on, Cornwell and many Mac Tools dealers, Matco Tools are sold by a local tool distributor who owns a territory by means of a franchise. The franchise owner drives to the work locations of potential customers, and typically offers financing to individuals looking to buy their tools. Matco trucks are easily identified by their white color with large blue and red Matco logo on the side.

NMTC, Inc. d/b/a/Matco Tools ("MATCO") is a Delaware corporation, incorporated on January 12, 1993. Matco is a wholly owned subsidiary of Matco Tools Corporation ("MTC"). MTC is a New Jersey corporation.

== Wage theft ==
On April 28, 2022, Matco Tools paid more than $15 million to resolve allegations that it misclassified employees (California Distributors) as contractors in order to avoid paying its workers overtime pay and deny them of their mandated breaks.

== Motorsport sponsorships ==
Matco sponsors, or has sponsored, several professional racing teams, including 4-time Top Fuel champion and 45-time NHRA winner Antron Brown, and NHRA Super Comp champion and Funny Car racer Jack Beckman.
