= Gilbarco Veeder-Root =

U.S. technology company

Gilbarco Inc.
- Type: Subsidiary of Vontier
- Industry: Manufacturing
- Founded: 1870 in Springfield, Massachusetts
- Headquarters: Greensboro, North Carolina
- Key people: Aaron Saak, President
- Products: Fuel Dispensers; Automatic Tank Gauging; Point of Sale Systems
- Revenue: 5 billion US$ (2025)
- Net income: 430.9 million US$ (2025)
- Number of employees: ~4,000 (2015)
- Parent: Vontier
- Subsidiaries: Invenco; Orpak Systems; Midco
- Website: www.gilbarco.com

Gilbarco Inc., doing business as Gilbarco Veeder-Root, is a supplier of fuel dispensers, point of sales systems, payment systems, forecourt merchandising and support services. The company operates as a subsidiary of Vontier and its headquarters are in Greensboro, North Carolina, United States.

The company's manufacturing and development facilities are located in Greensboro, and in Simsbury, Connecticut, Altoona, Pennsylvania, Lakewood, Colorado, Tipp City, Ohio and Davenport, Iowa. International research and development locations include the US, New Zealand, and India.

Gilbarco and Dover Corporation are considered to have a duopoly in fuel dispensers in Western countries.

== History ==
Gilbert and Barker manufacturing buildings in West Springfield, Massachusetts

The company was founded under the name Gilbert & Barker in 1870 by Charles Gilbert and John Barker in Springfield, Massachusetts, and by 1911 had introduced the first measuring gasoline pump. The company was renamed as Gilbarco in 1929. For nearly 100 years Gilbarco was an affiliate of what is today the Exxon Mobil Corporation until it was later acquired by the British engineering company GEC in 1987. Among Gilbarco's first products was a simple oil burning lamp, which was given away in China and other places to increase the purchase of lamp oil. That lamp was so popular within the Exxon culture that it was the inspiration for the name of Exxon's in house magazine "The Lamp" until that publication was discontinued in recent years. In 1999 GEC renamed itself to Marconi and Gilbarco became Marconi Commerce Systems. In 2002 Gilbarco was acquired by the Danaher Corporation, parent company of Veeder-Root and Red Jacket companies, and became Gilbarco Veeder-Root.

Although the company spent its formative years in Springfield, Massachusetts as well as West Springfield, Massachusetts, being the largest employer in the latter by the 1960s, in 1965 it moved all of its offices and manufacturing to North Carolina, citing labor and material costs.

In 1984, Gilbarco launched one of the first examples in the US, and at the time, most successful instances of lean manufacturing called CRISP: Continuous Rapid Improvement System of Production. As a result, in 1994 Gilbarco's United States manufacturing plant in Greensboro, North Carolina was designated by Industry Week magazine as one of the United States' Ten Best Plants. After Gilbarco was acquired by Danaher, the Gilbarco CRISP system was extended and adopted company wide and ultimately evolved into what is today known as the Danaher Business System.

In 2002, the Gilbarco and Veeder-Root companies combined into one marketing brand.

In May 2008, the company launched the website AskAboutPCI.com, as a reference for convenience store retailers to learn more about the Payment Card Industry (PCI) rules, regulations, and deadlines.

In November 2009, Larsen and Toubro (L&T) sold its petroleum dispensing pump (PDP) business to Gilbarco Veeder-Root, a US-based fuel control service provider, for around Rs 150 crore. Gilbarco said it acquired the business as part of a plan to increase its presence in the local metering business.

Gilbarco Veeder-Root was featured on the June 14, 2008, episode of the television show John Ratzenberger's Made in America. Danaher spun off several subsidiaries, including Gilbarco Veeder-Root, in 2016 to create Fortive.

In 2018, Gilbarco Veeder-Root announced acquisition of Midco Limited, an Indian fuel dispenser manufacturer established in 1949 based out of Mumbai. Midco has a production unit in Vatva, Gujarat with installed capacity of 50,000 nozzle pumps per annum.

In May 2019, Gilbarco Veeder-Root announced that after extensive testing of Passport version 11.04B, CITGO Petroleum Corporation released EMV acceptance software for retailers at the forecourt. Along with EMV, Version 11.04B brings Passport EDGE to the CITGO network and is now available to CITGO branded sites with Gilbarco Veeder-Root dispensers. Passport EDGE is Gilbarco’s new tablet-based POS system for small businesses, available as a low cost subscription, and EMV-ready indoor and outdoor acceptance.

On August 31, 2022, Vontier announced its acquisition of Invenco, which would become part of Gilbarco Veeder-Root. Nearly a year later, Gilbarco Veeder-Root Retail Solutions announced it would change its name to Invenco by GVR, with Passport, Orpak, Insite 360 and DOMS part of the brand.

== Products ==
- Veeder-Root supplies automatic tank gauging and fuel management systems, including the Red Jacket brand of submersible pumps and pressurized line leak detectors. A subsidiary, ANGI Energy Systems, develops and produces compressed natural gas (CNG) systems. Veeder-Root is headquartered in Simsbury, Connecticut.
- Gasboy International is a manufacturer and marketer of commercial electronic and mechanical petroleum dispensing systems, fleet management systems, and transfer pumps, primarily for non-retail petroleum applications. Gasboy also offers a complementary line of automated fueling systems that provide 24-hour unattended fueling capabilities to fleets and retail marketers. Gasboy is headquartered in Greensboro, North Carolina.

== See also ==
- Coulomb Technologies
- National Association of Convenience Stores
