= Robert S. Landauer =

Robert S. Landauer, Jr. (1924-2004) was an American scientist specializing in radiation measurement. He grew up in Highland Park, Illinois. He founded Landauer, Inc. in 1954, which is the world's largest provider of radiation measurement products, and is headquartered in Glenwood, Illinois.
