= Blackhawk (tools) =

American brand of hand tools

- Product type: Hand tools
- Current owner: Stanley Black & Decker
- Country: USA
- Introduced: May 31, 1919; 107 years ago
- Previous owners: National Hand Tool, Litton Industries, New Britain Machine Company, Applied Power Corporation, American Grinder
- Website: www.stanleyproto.com

Blackhawk is an American brand of hand tools. It is currently a sub-brand of the Proto division of the Stanley Black & Decker.

== History ==
Blackhawk Manufacturing was founded in 1919 in Milwaukee, Wisconsin, as a subsidiary of the American Grinder Company (later named Applied Power Corporation). It made automotive tools, such as wrenches and sockets, and a number of specialty tools.

Blackhawk introduced a number of innovations to conventional drive tools, such as the "Lock-On" system of locking sockets, gearless ratchets, telescoping ratchet handles, and 7/16" drive tools. Many of these designs were developed by engineers Edward Pfauser and Sigmund Mandl (the latter notable for having founded the Husky Wrench Company prior to working for Blackhawk). Tools from the mid-20th century had distinctive art deco styling and remain highly collectible.

Blackhawk also partnered with the Armstrong Bros. Tool Company in the late 1920s through the late 1940s to produce a range of open-ended wrenches under the "Blackhawk–Armstrong" label.

Blackhawk also produced Blackhawk Jack brand floor jacks under the Blackhawk Mfg. Co. name including a handy 1-1/2 Ton heavy steel wheeled model.

In the early 1950s, the Blackhawk hand tool line was acquired by the New Britain Machine Company. In the 1970s, Litton Industries purchased New Britain. In the 1980s, National Hand Tool acquired parts of Litton's erstwhile hand tools division, including the Blackhawk and Husky brands. And in 1986, the Stanley Works acquired National Hand Tool, and with it, the Blackhawk brand.

== Gallery ==
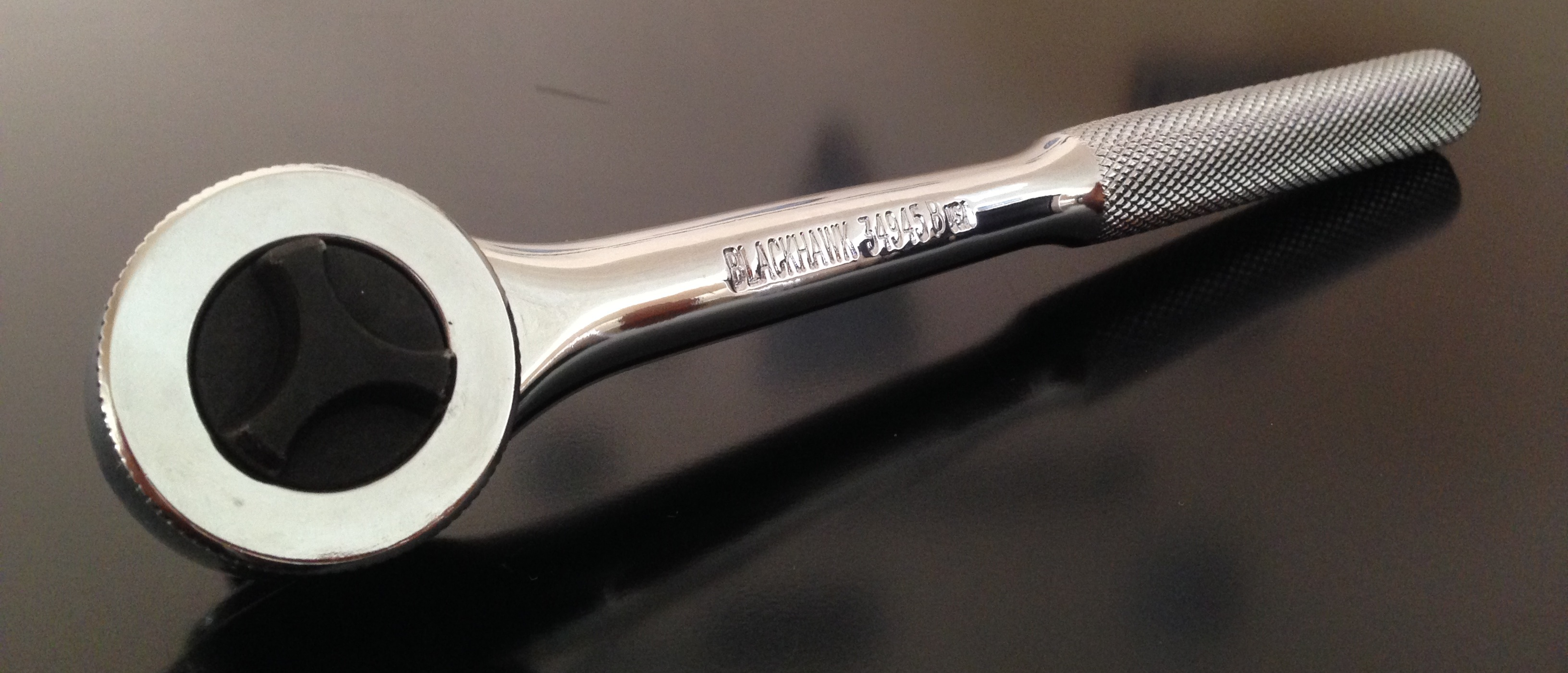
A Stanley-era Blackhawk round-head ratchet.

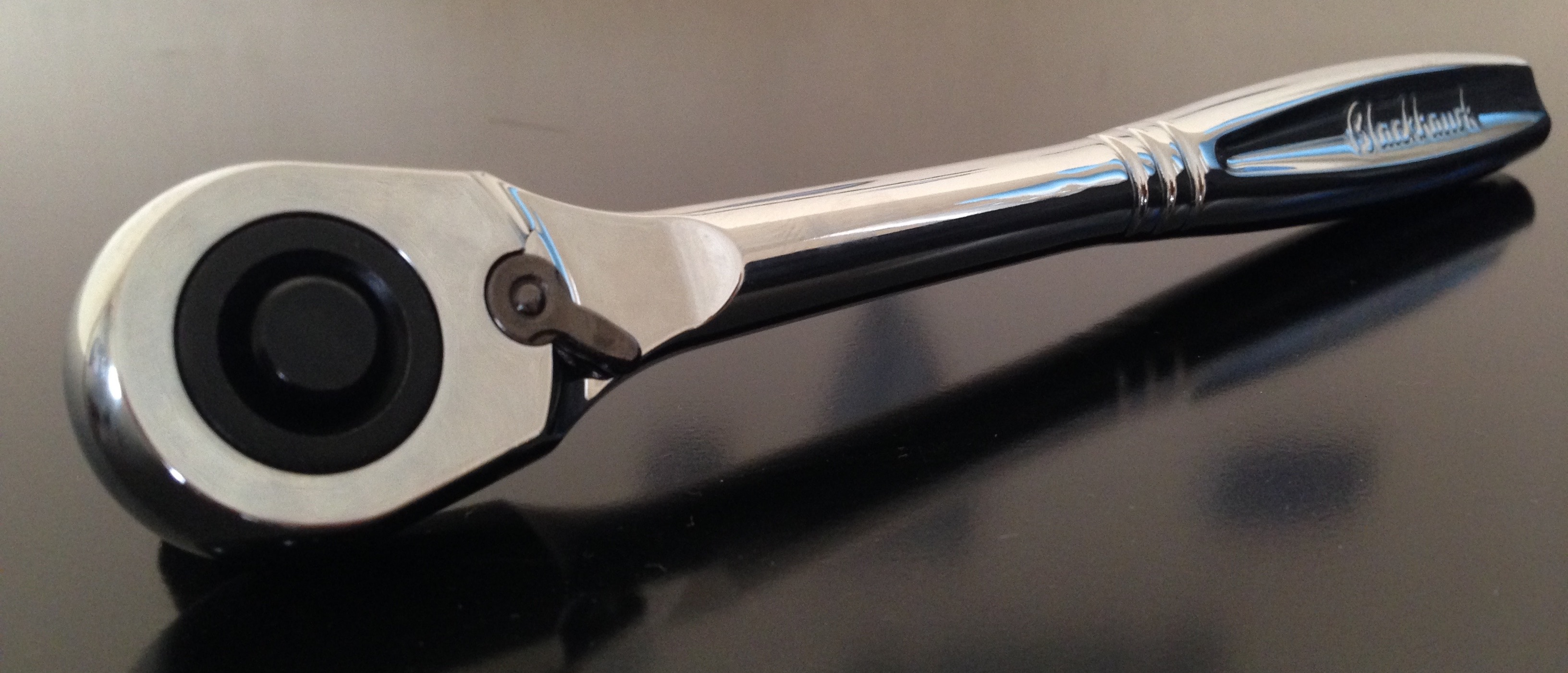
A modern Blackhawk pear-head ratchet.

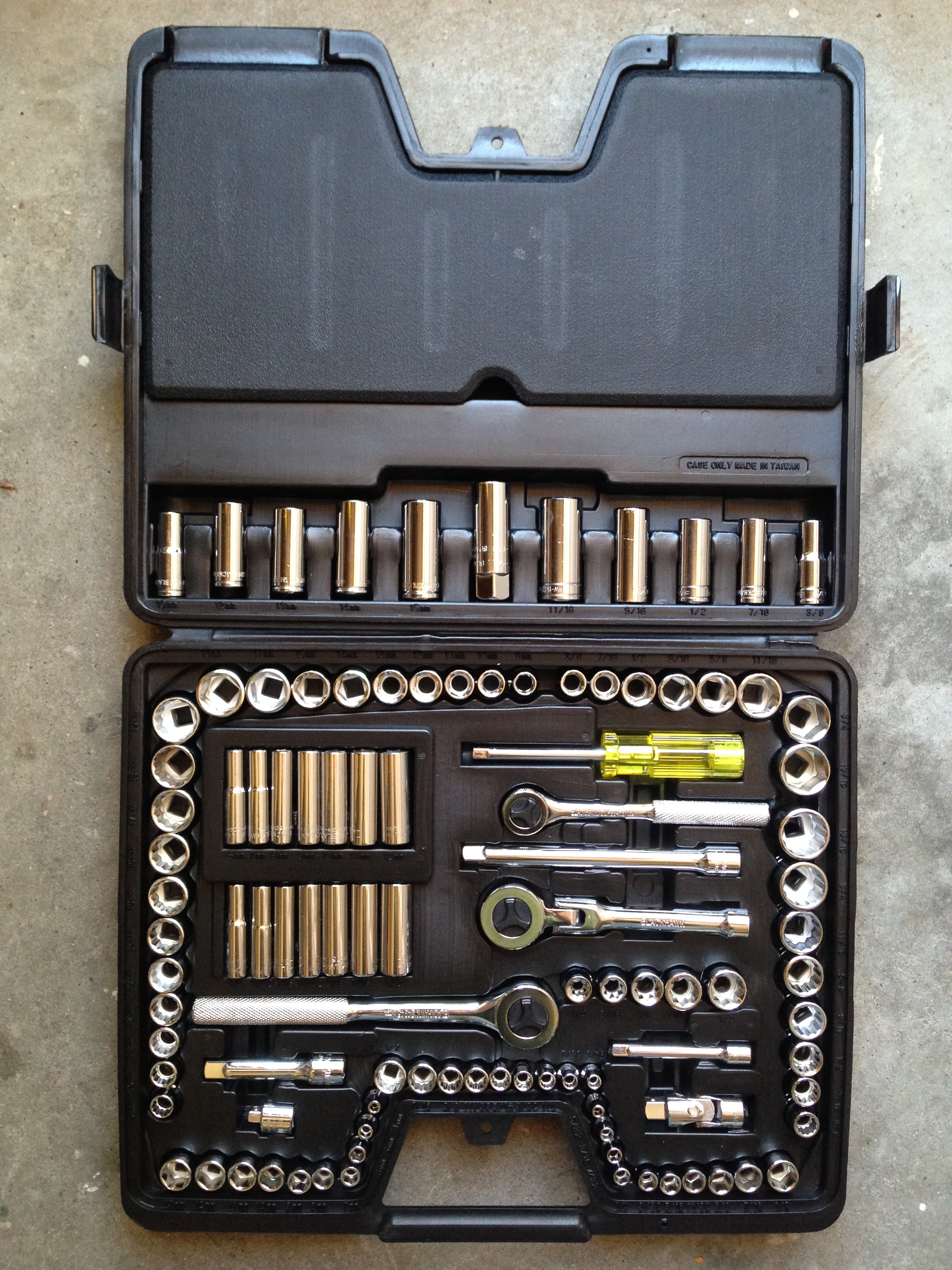
A mechanic's tool set.

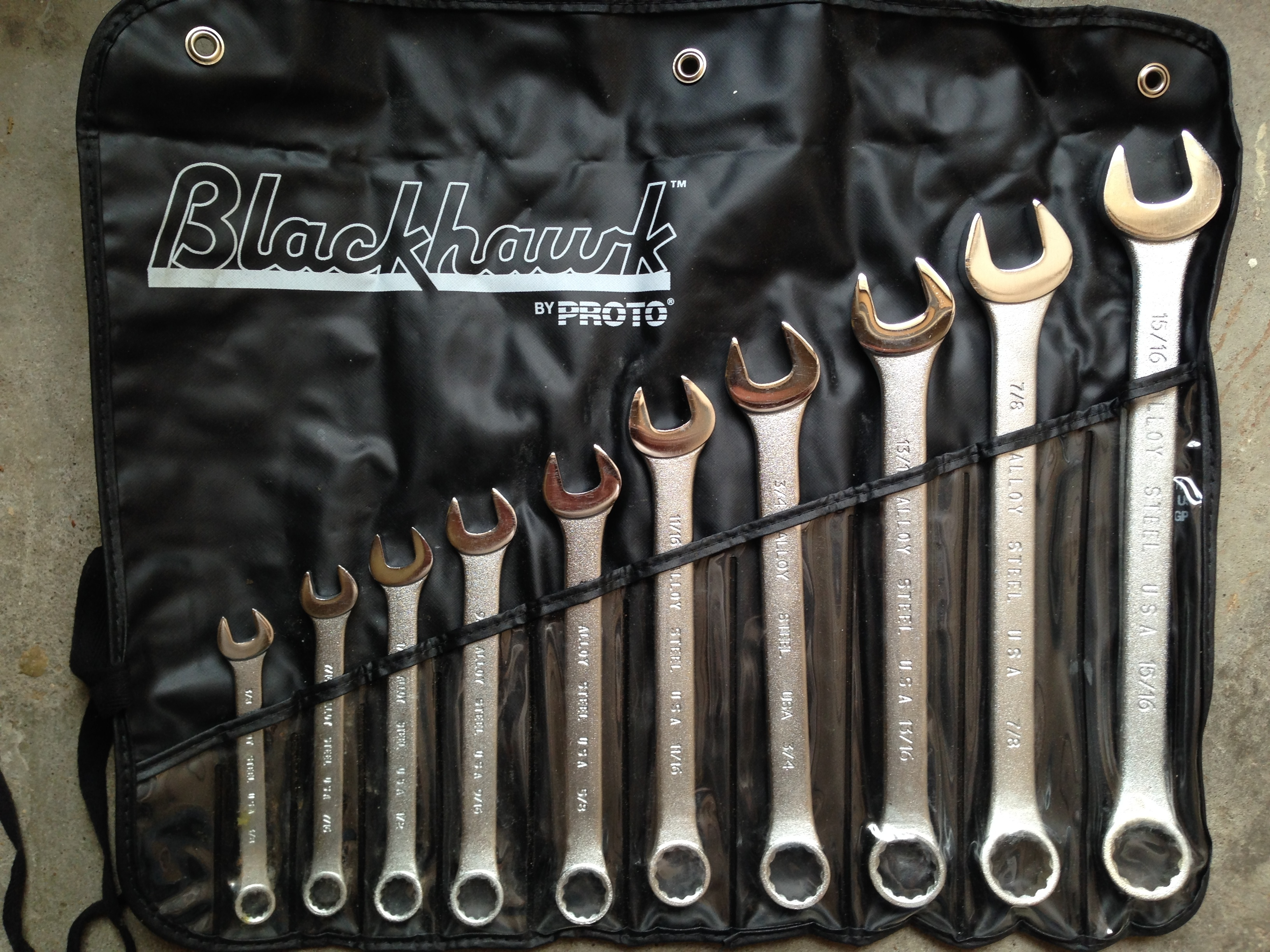
A set of combination wrenches.
