= J.H. Williams Tool Group =

American tool manufacturer

Williams
- Product type: Subsidiary
- Current owner: Snap-on
- Country: USA
- Introduced: 1882
- Website: www.williams-industrial.com

Snap-on Industrial Brands, historically J.H. Williams Tool Group, is a division of American hand tool manufacturer Snap-on that makes and distributes tools to industrial markets. In addition to the Williams brand from which it originated, the group includes Bahco and CDI Torque Products.

== History ==
In 1882, James Harvey Williams and Matthew Diamond founded Williams & Diamond in Flushing, Queens, a drop forging business. The business was relocated to Brooklyn in 1884 and took the name J.H. Williams & Co in 1887. The company was one of the first to offer mass-produced drop-forged hand tools. A second factory was opened in Buffalo, New York in 1914, now the site of General Motors' Tonawanda Engine plant.

The company was acquired by Snap-on in 1993. In 2011 it was officially renamed Snap-on Industrial Brands.

== Gallery ==
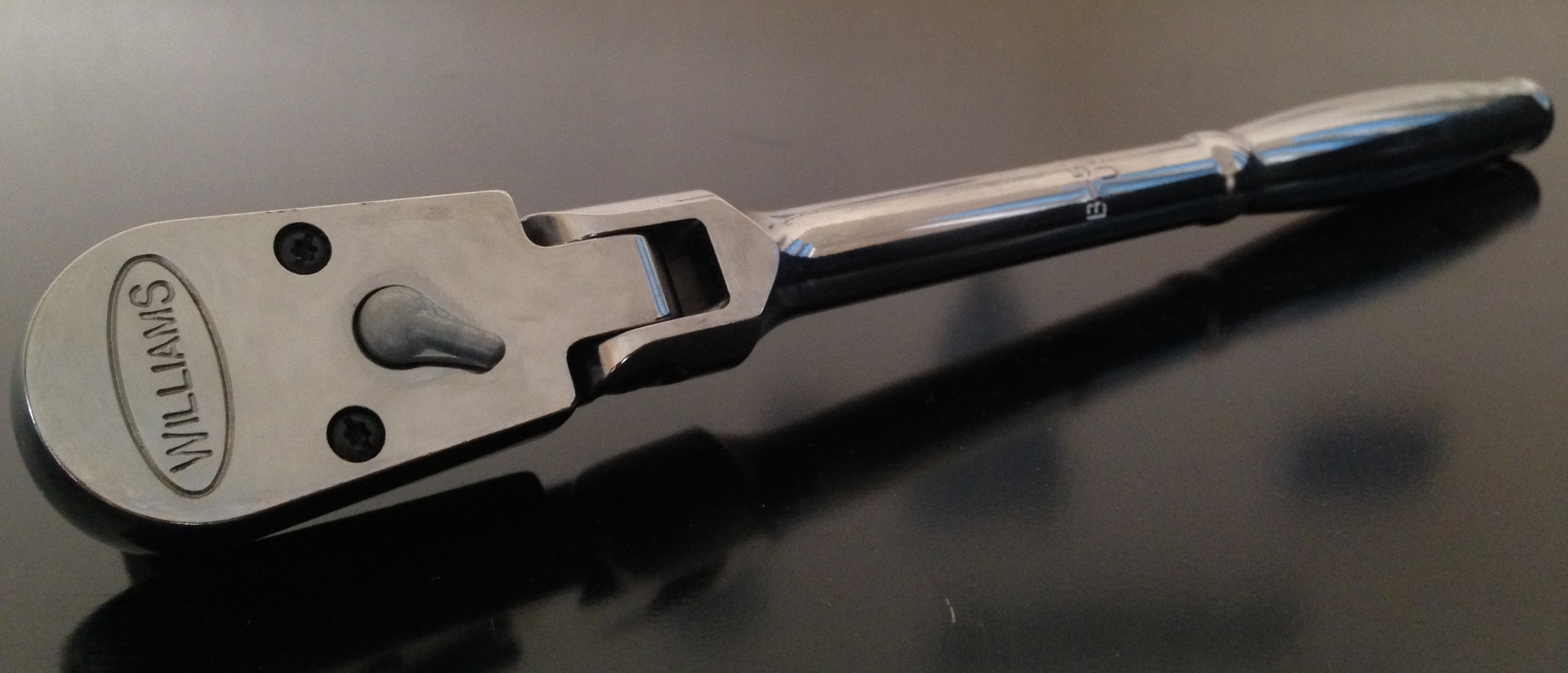
A Williams flex-head ratchet.

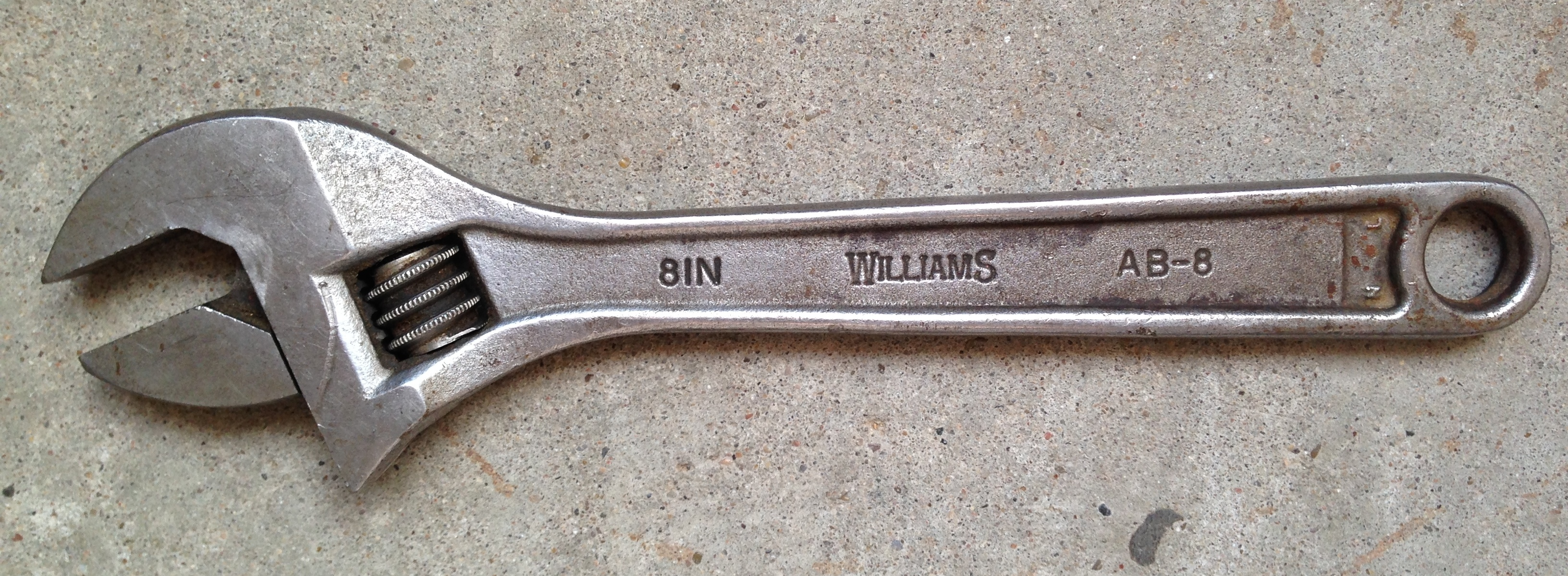
A Williams adjustable wrench.

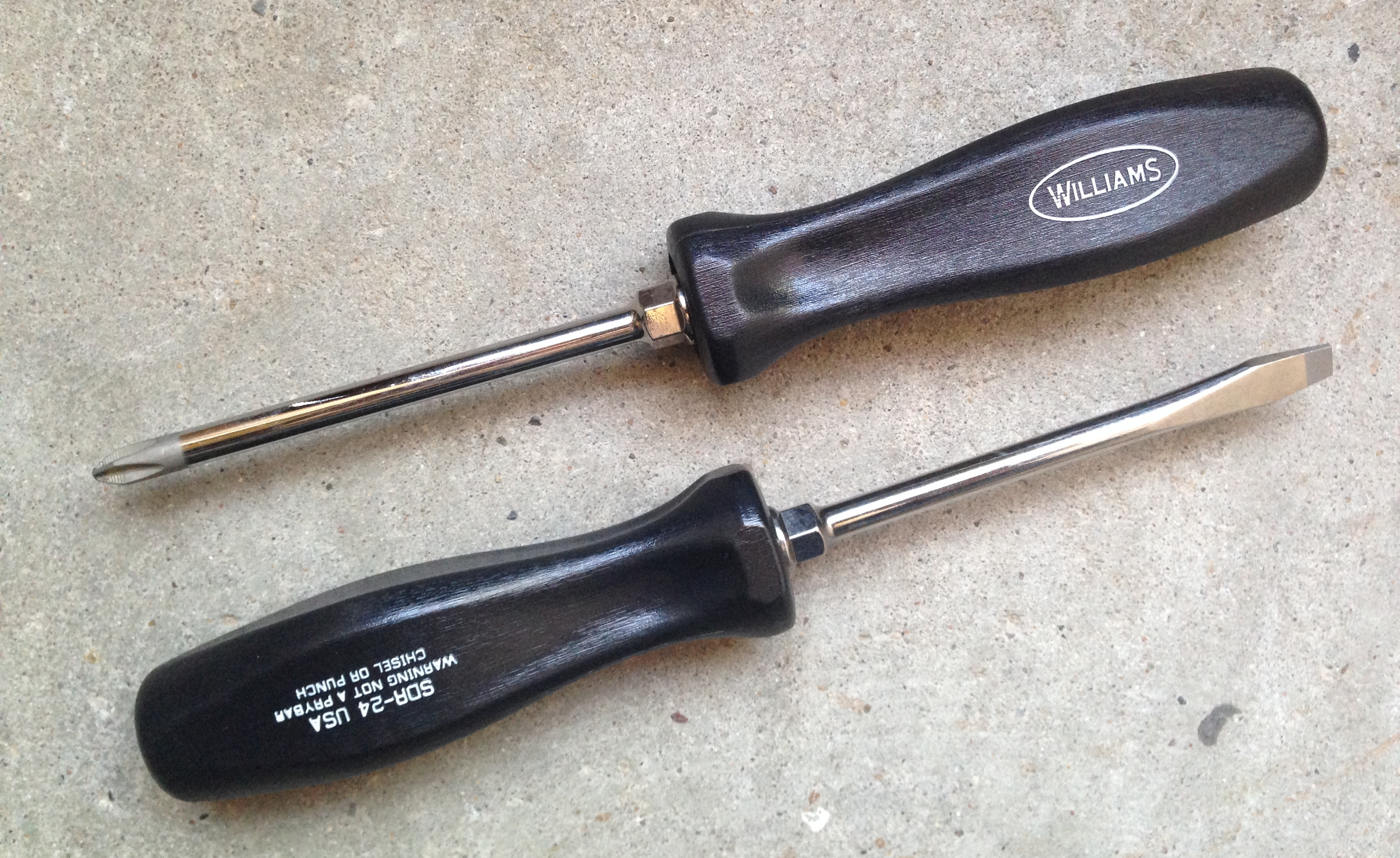
Two Williams "hard handle" screwdrivers.

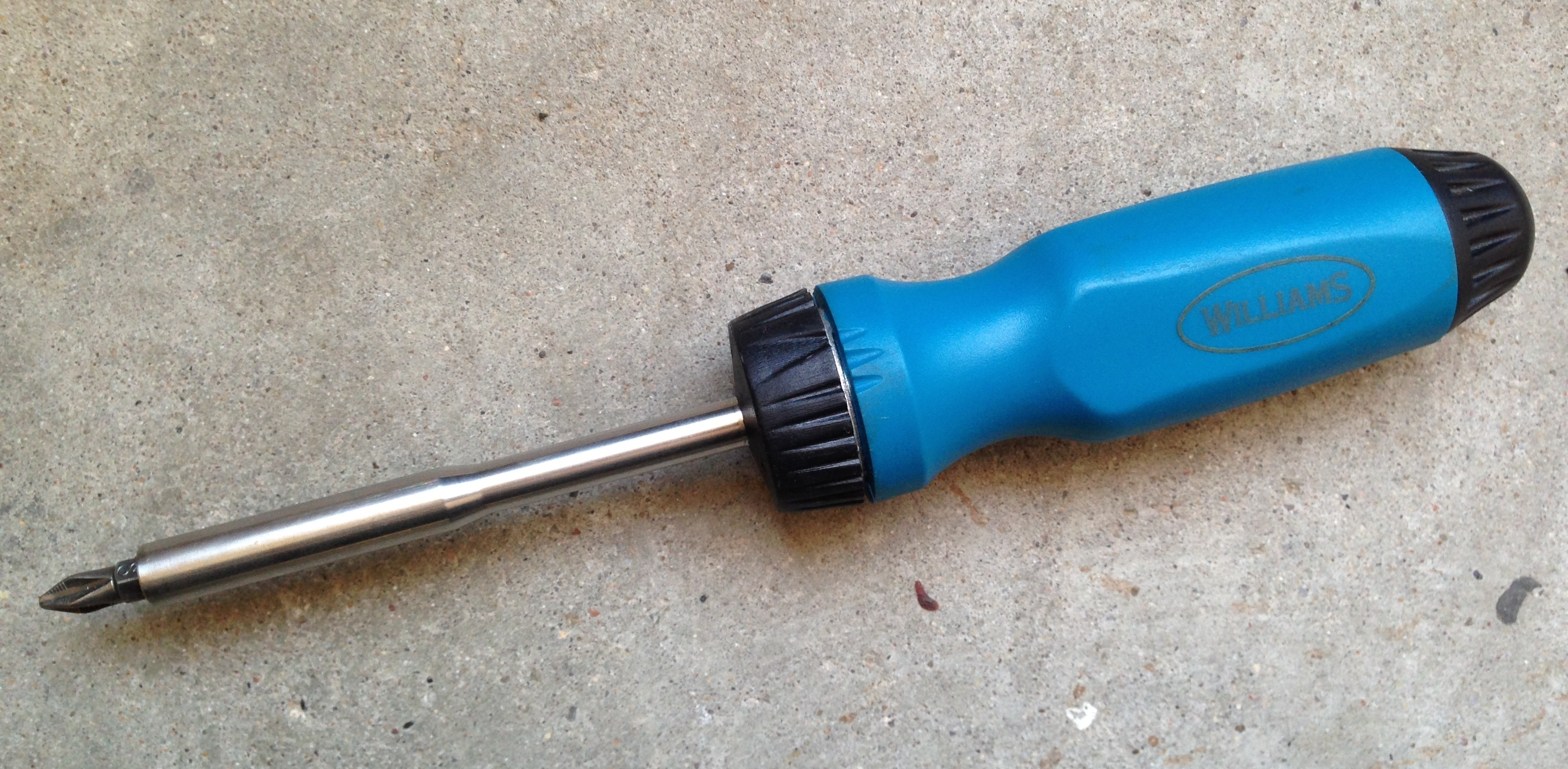
A Williams ratcheting screwdriver.
