= Craftsman (tools) =

Line of tools, lawn and garden equipment, and work wear

- Product type: Hand tools, power tools, lawn and garden equipment, work wear
- Current owner: Sears (1927–2017); Stanley Black & Decker (2017–present)
- Country: United States
- Introduced: May 20, 1927; 99 years ago
- Related brands: Evolv, Craftsman Professional, Craftsman Industrial, Companion, Dunlap
- Website: www.craftsman.com

Craftsman is a line of tools, lawn and garden equipment, and work wear. Originally a house brand established by Sears, the brand is now owned by Stanley Black & Decker.

As with all Sears products, Craftsman tools were not manufactured by Sears during the company's ownership, but made under contract by various other companies. While Sears did not directly manufacture tools and equipment in most cases, they did have ownership in some of their suppliers. An example of this was the joint venture that they established with Western Forge in 1965 and their partial ownership of Roper for a number of years. Both companies supplied products to Sears for many years. They were first sold in 1927 through the Sears catalog and in Sears retail stores. After the Sears–Kmart merger, the tools were also for sale in Kmart stores and through several other retailers.

In March 2017, Stanley Black & Decker acquired the Craftsman brand from Sears Holdings, which retained a limited license for Craftsman products.

== History ==
Companion logo

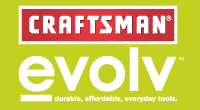
Craftsman Evolv logo

The Craftsman trademark was registered by Sears on May 20, 1927. Arthur Barrows, head of the company's hardware department, liked the name Craftsman and reportedly bought the rights to use it from the Marion-Craftsman Tool Company for $500 (equivalent to $9,267 in 2025). The brand's early customers were mostly farmers. Barrows' successor, Tom Dunlap, upgraded the quality of the tools and added chrome plating to them as America moved into the automobile age.

Sears's tool line, like many of its other product lines, used a good–better–best pricing structure, with the Craftsman brand as the middle tier and Craftsman Professional or Craftsman Industrial as the highest tier. Craftsman Professional and Craftsman Industrial are marketed as being comparable to brands like Cornwell Quality Tools, SK, Snap-on, Proto, Mac, and Matco. The standard Craftsman line is marketed as being comparable in quality to other mid-price brands including UltraPro (NAPA), Westward, Husky, and Kobalt.

The original "Sears" tool line was discontinued in the late 1980s and replaced by the "Companion" tool line. The Companion tool line was itself discontinued and replaced by the "Evolv" tool line in 2008 designed by Ellen Tave Glassman, VP Hardines Design Craftsman, with a focus on homeowners and DIYers. Evolv tools also have a lifetime warranty but require that the customer have the original dated receipt to make a claim.

From 1991 until the store's demise, Sears ran the Craftsman Club loyalty program, one of the oldest such programs by a retailer.

Craftsman tools were sold in Sears and sister store Kmart, as well as US military Army & Air Force Exchange Service stores, Navy Exchange stores, Summit Racing Equipment, Blain's Farm & Fleet, W. W. Grainger, Ace Hardware, Montgomery Ward, Lowe's, and Amazon.

On January 5, 2017, Stanley Black & Decker announced its intent to acquire the Craftsman brand in a deal with a total value of $900 million (with an up-front payment of $525 million, and a payment of $250 million after three years). Sears will hold a royalty-free license to the Craftsman brand for a 15-year period after the completion of the sale, and will receive a royalty on all new Craftsman sales over this period. Afterwards, Sears will pay Stanley Black & Decker a 3% licensing fee. The deal was closed on March 9, 2017. Sears maintains the right to manufacture and sell tools using existing supply channels under the Craftsman name for 15 years.

Lowe's announced in October 2017 that it would start carrying Craftsman tools beginning in the late half of 2018.

== Sourcing ==
Sears has never manufactured Craftsman products itself, instead relying on other manufacturers to make the products for them following Sears designs and specifications, and then applying the Craftsman brand name. Sometimes, the Craftsman branded items include exclusive features or functions that separate them from the manufacturer's own brand or other brands that the manufacturer produces. At other times, Craftsman products are identical to models of other brands with a different name on them.

The hardline mechanic's tools (such as socket wrenches) that make up the core of the brand have been made by a variety of manufacturers over the years, including New Britain, Moore Drop Forging, Stanley, Easco Hand Tools, Danaher Corporation, and most recently, Apex Tool Group. Screwdrivers have been manufactured by Pratt-Read and Western Forge, but until around 2017–2018 were supplied mostly by the latter company, which also had supplied pliers and adjustable wrenches. As of 2019, Western Forge no longer supplies Craftsman tools.

Shortly after Stanley acquired the Craftsman brand, Stanley announced the construction of a factory in northern Fort Worth, Texas to bring Craftsman tool manufacturing back to the US. This arrangement was short-lived, however, as the plant produced some ratchets and sockets, but due to equipment problems, could not produce the needed volume that was originally expected. The plant closed shortly thereafter.

Many Craftsman portable power tools have been manufactured by Techtronic Industries who acquired the prior supplier—Diehl Motor Company (a one time division of Singer) and Ryobi. Sears hand power tools have also been produced by DeWalt under the "900" model prefix. Some, such as the corded and cordless drills, were indistinguishable, other than the color and decal labels. Many Craftsman bench and stationary power tools were manufactured by Emerson Electric under the "113" model prefix (previously under the "103" model prefix which was King-Seeley, but Emerson bought them out in the 1960s) and DeWalt. Air compressors were manufactured by DeVilbiss Air Power (formerly part of Dewalt. DeVilbiss is now owned by MAT Holdings who made compressors for Sears under the "921" model prefix), and formerly by Campbell Hausfeld under the "106" model prefix.

Tool storage has typically been manufactured by Waterloo Industries ("706" model prefix), however, as of 2017, they were acquired by Stanley, Black and Decker, and as of 2020, Waterloo no longer manufactures tool storage for the Sears line of Craftsman. It is now supplied under the "714" model prefix by Montezuma Tool Storage, but the Craftsman tool storage sold in Lowes is still Waterloo made. The Craftsman-branded garage door openers are manufactured by the Chamberlain Group ("139" model prefix). Hammers have been produced by Vaughan-Bushnell (coded "M" on the tool).

== Quality and reputation ==
In 2007, a Harris Interactive poll gave Craftsman the highest score for both "Brand Expectations" and "Trust". In 2009, the readers of Popular Mechanics named Craftsman their favorite brand of hand tools in their Reader's Choice Awards.

== Warranty ==
Most Craftsman hand tools are advertised as having an unlimited lifetime warranty. This lifetime warranty program was instituted by Sears when they began selling the Craftsman line in 1927. This warranty program requires no receipt or dated proof of purchase. If the owner takes the item into a local retail store, it may be replaced or repaired free of charge.

The full text of the warranty is as follows:

If, for any reason, your Craftsman hand tool ever fails to provide complete satisfaction, return it to any Sears store or other Craftsman outlet in the United States for free repair or replacement. This warranty gives you specific legal rights and you may also have other rights which vary from state to state.

Sears has reduced the warranty in effect on many Craftsman non-powered lawn and garden products including rakes, shovels, clippers, brooms, trowels, pruners, hoses, sprinklers, hose nozzles, and other small gardening hand tools. Previously, it was a lifetime warranty—which on August 2, 2012, was reduced to 25 years with receipt required. The lifetime warranty does not include precision hand tools, such as calipers and torque wrenches.

Many consumers have also been reporting problems when attempting to obtain warranty repair or replacement on tools that are covered by the full lifetime warranty. Sears' official position is that the warranty should be honored, and much of the problem may lie with individual sales associates. In some cases, Sears no longer sells particular Craftsman tools (tape measures, and wood clamps are two examples), making it impossible to replace a tool sold with a lifetime warranty with a similar Craftsman tool that will continue the warranty.

Some Sears stores limit the number of hand tools that can be exchanged per day, in an effort to reduce the abuse of the lifetime warranty. Stanley Black & Decker has stated that all previous warranties on Craftsman products will be honored after the purchase of Craftsman in 2017. Some of the newer packaging (as of 2018 onward) on some Craftsman products does indicate that there may be a limit on returning warranty tools. As of February 2019, the "non-Sears" Craftsman does not have "open stock" in the stores as Sears does to replace individual items from a set that may require warranty. Stanley Black and Decker has indicated that they are working on introducing more individual tools to stores.

Power tools have a one-year warranty.

Customers are able to exchange any version of the Sears Craftsman product at the stores that sell Sears Craftsman products such as Sears, Kmart, Ace, etc. Stores such as Lowes that sell Stanley Black & Decker Craftsman products will exchange replacement items at Stanley Craftsman supplied stores if they have the item. Lowes Corp stated, "We will honor all lifetime warranties no matter where the Craftsman hand tool was purchased.".

== Legal disputes ==
In 1963, Sears employee Peter M. Roberts developed a quick release feature for socket wrenches. The feature allowed a person using such a ratchet to remove the socket from the wrench with one hand, freeing the second hand from grabbing the socket while the other hand held the ratchet.

Roberts developed a prototype and applied for a patent in 1964. While the patent was pending, he approached Sears and introduced the idea to them. Sears, which sold millions of sockets every year, saw the potential in the invention and asked for the prototype so it could be tested. After testing revealed the quick release would not weaken the ratchet, Sears began market testing the new ratchet and received favorable feedback. Sears then incorporated the quick release into a new line of ratchets, projecting sales of up to 750,000 units in the first year alone.

In January 1965, Roberts received a phone call from a Sears attorney asking for the name of Roberts' patent lawyer. Without Roberts's knowledge, Sears hired the patent lawyer, Charles Fay, and Fay ended up representing both Roberts and Sears regarding the patent. Around this time, Roberts's patent was approved, but Fay did not reveal this to Roberts. Negotiations for use of the quick release commenced, with Roberts being told that the quick release wasn't new and that any patent issued would be limited. Sears's lawyers also said that because of the cost (44 cents per wrench) of adding the quick release to the wrenches, a license was worth only $10,000. What Sears didn't tell Roberts was that it planned to make 50,000 of the new wrenches per week. Roberts sued Sears in 1969 after seeing his quick release on a wrench prominently displayed in a Sears catalog, but it wasn't until 1989 that the case was finally settled. Neither side revealed the amount of the settlement.

In August 2002, Sears sued Emerson for using Sears-owned manufacturing equipment to create power tools for Home Depot. Upon the expiration of Emerson's 30-year contract to make Craftsman tools, Emerson was required to return the Sears-owned equipment. Instead, Emerson kept the equipment, claiming it to be obsolete and of little value. Emerson denied the allegations when the suit was filed, but paid Sears $10.8 million and returned all the equipment, while admitting no wrongdoing.

In 2004, a class action by customers accused Sears of false advertising and consumer fraud for questionable use of the slogan "Made in the USA" for Craftsman tools.

In 2012, Sears was sued by LoggerHead Tools, makers of the Bionic Wrench, after Sears released a competing product, the MaxAccess. Sears had sold the Bionic Wrench in its stores, but decided to not talk to LoggerHead about licensing the patent. Instead, Sears had its tool manufacturer, Apex Tools, create the MaxAccess wrench under the Craftsman name, claiming that the MaxAccess was designed not to infringe the Bionic Wrench patent. Other than coloring, the only substantial difference between the two wrenches was that the Bionic Wrench had the head at a 45-degree angle while the MaxAccess head was straight. LoggerHead was subsequently awarded $6 million in damages, but the verdict to be set aside because the judge misinterpreted the LoggerHead patent.

In April 2017, Sears sued Western Forge, its former supplier of hand tools, for abruptly ending the contract to supply the tools. Western Forge violated the contract by demanding more money because of Sears's financial problems.

On March 6, 2019, Sears was sued by Stanley Black & Decker, which accused it of breach of contract and trademark infringement over its new line of professional-grade mechanics tools under the Craftsman Ultimate Collection brand. According to the complaint, Sears breached the license agreement by launching its new tool line and touting its stores as "the real home of the broadest assortment of Craftsman".

== Sponsorships ==
From 1995 to 2008, Craftsman sponsored the NASCAR Craftsman Truck Series, a deal which began with the inception of the Truck Series. After the 2008 season, Craftsman withdrew from sponsoring the series and was replaced by Camping World. In 2016, Craftsman returned to motorsports sponsorship, serving as the title name for the World of Outlaws, renaming the Sprint Car Series and Late Model Series to the World of Outlaws Craftsman Sprint Car Series and World of Outlaws Craftsman Late Model Series, respectively.

In 2023, Stanley Black & Decker acquired the title sponsorship rights to NASCAR's Truck Series, for which it would reinstate the Craftsman branding.

== Gallery ==
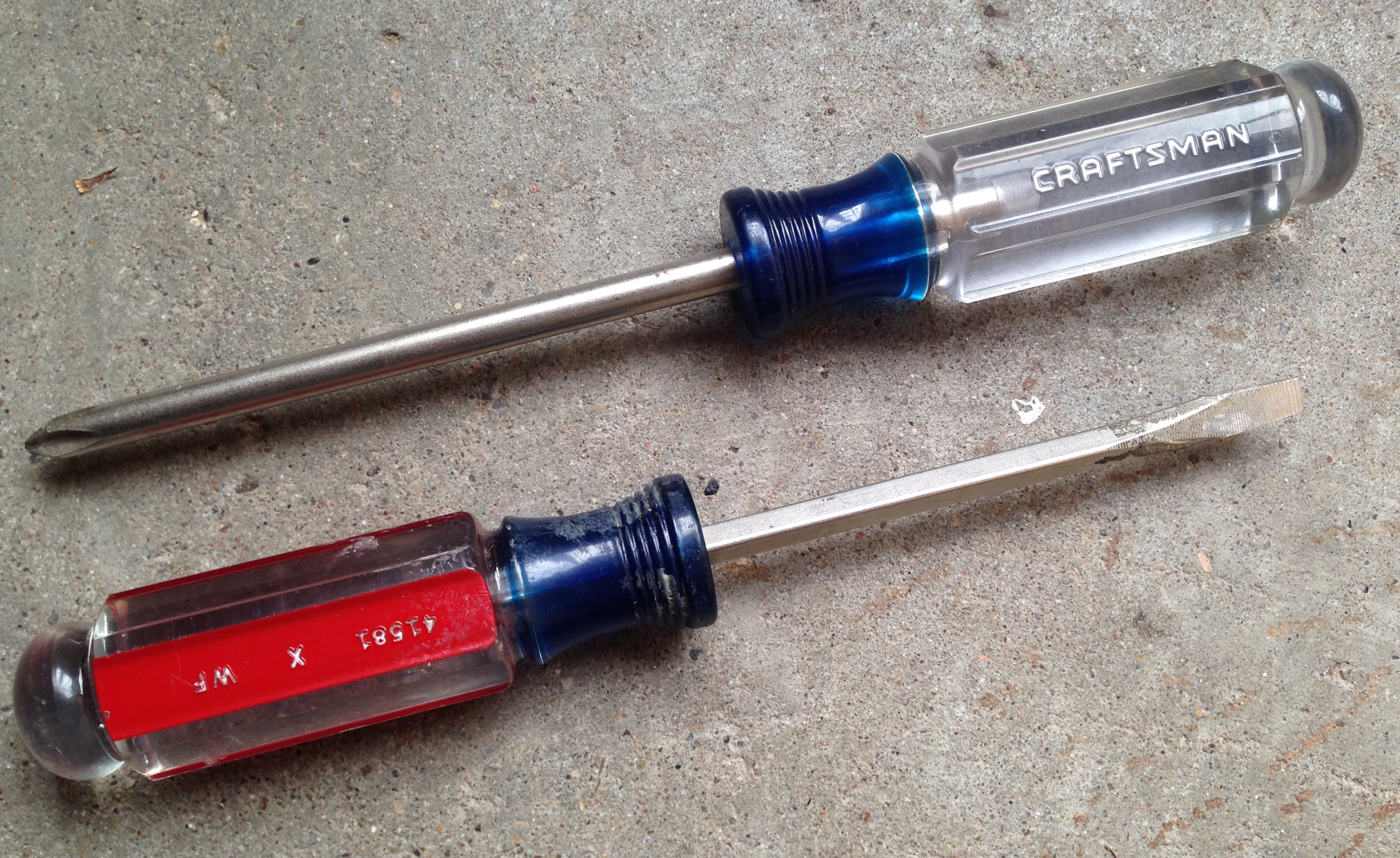
Two screwdrivers

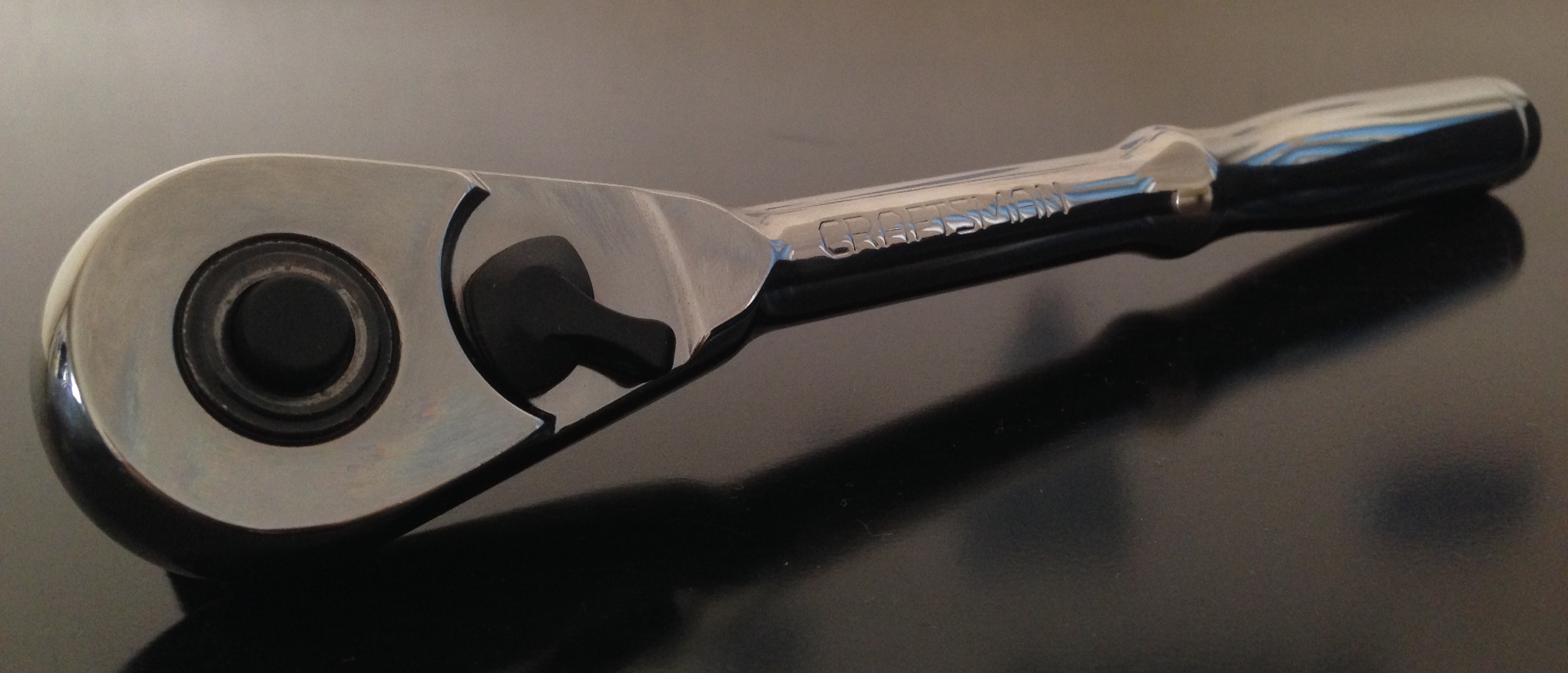
A full polish ratchet

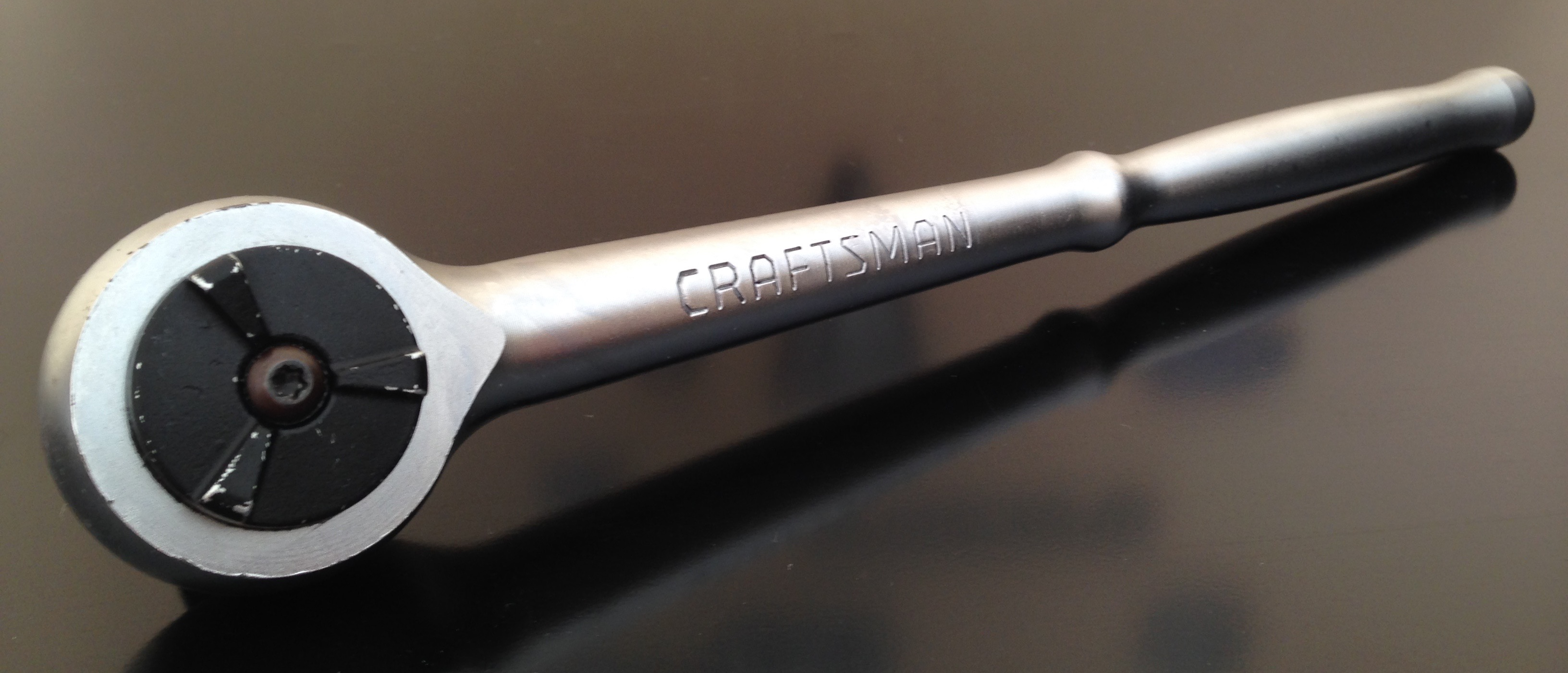
A roundhead ratchet

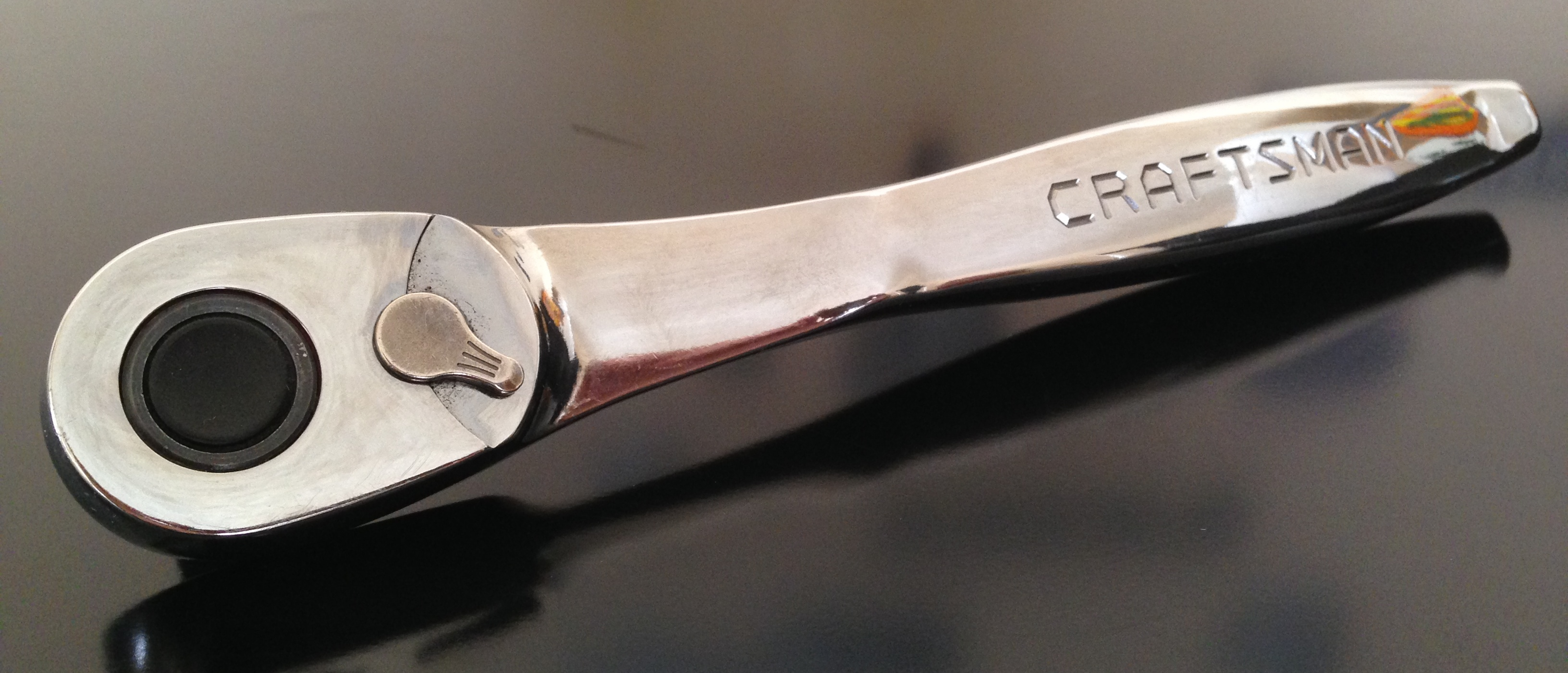
A thin profile ratchet

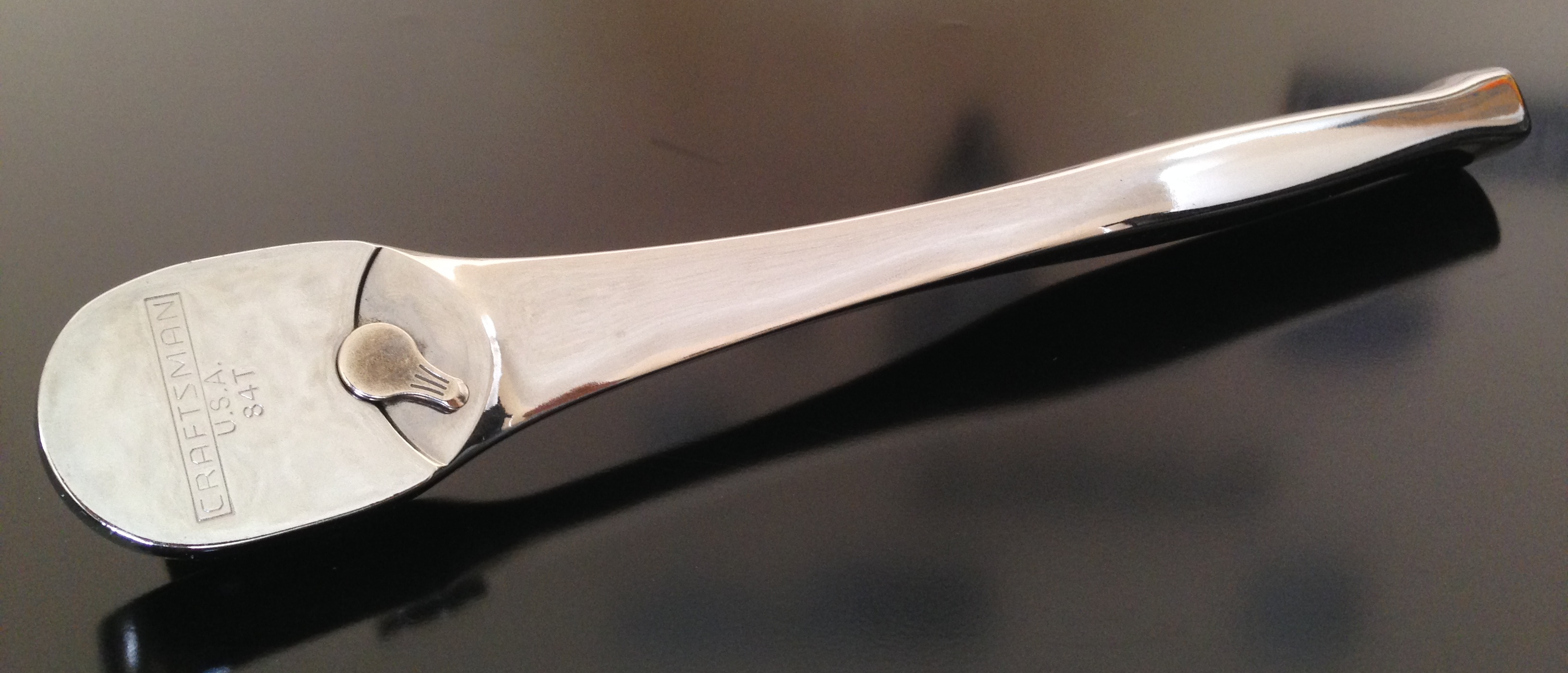
A fine-tooth "premium" ratchet

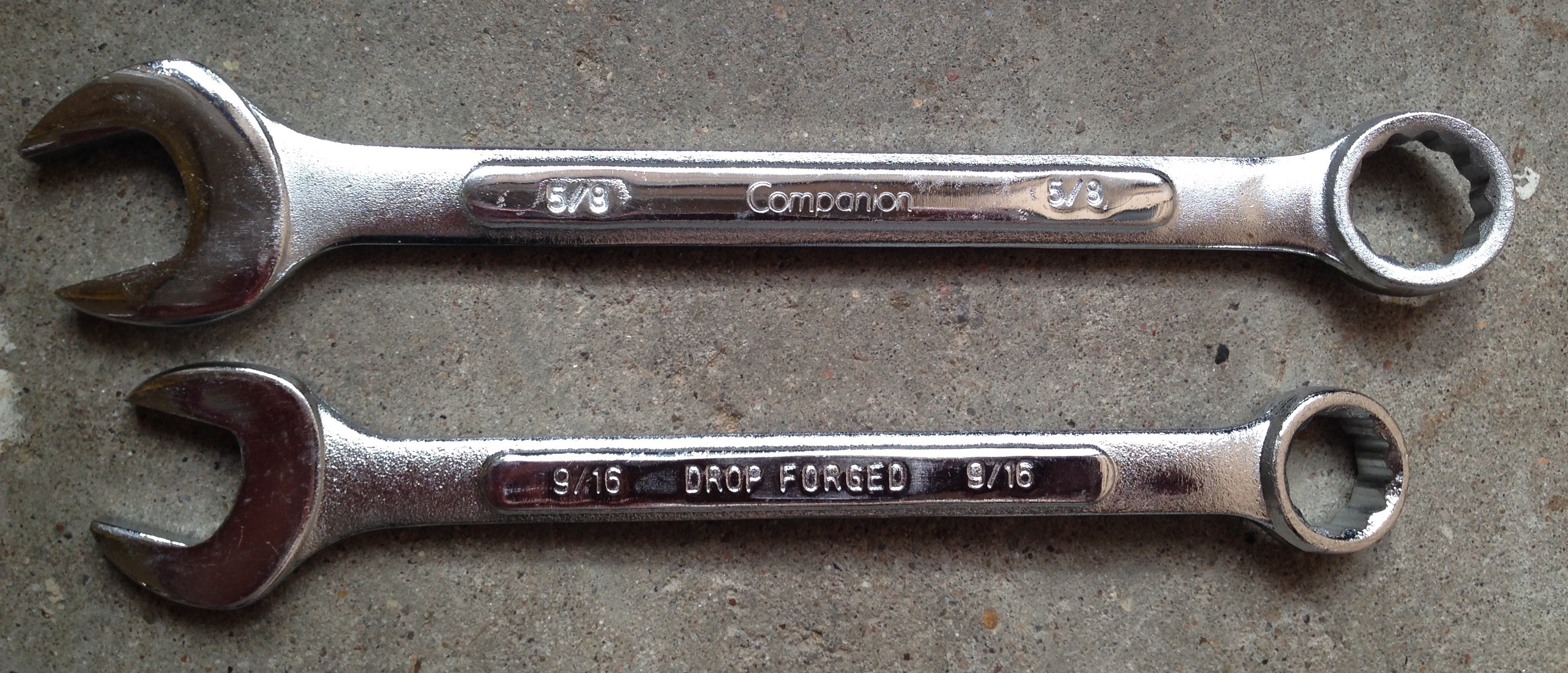
Companion combination wrenches

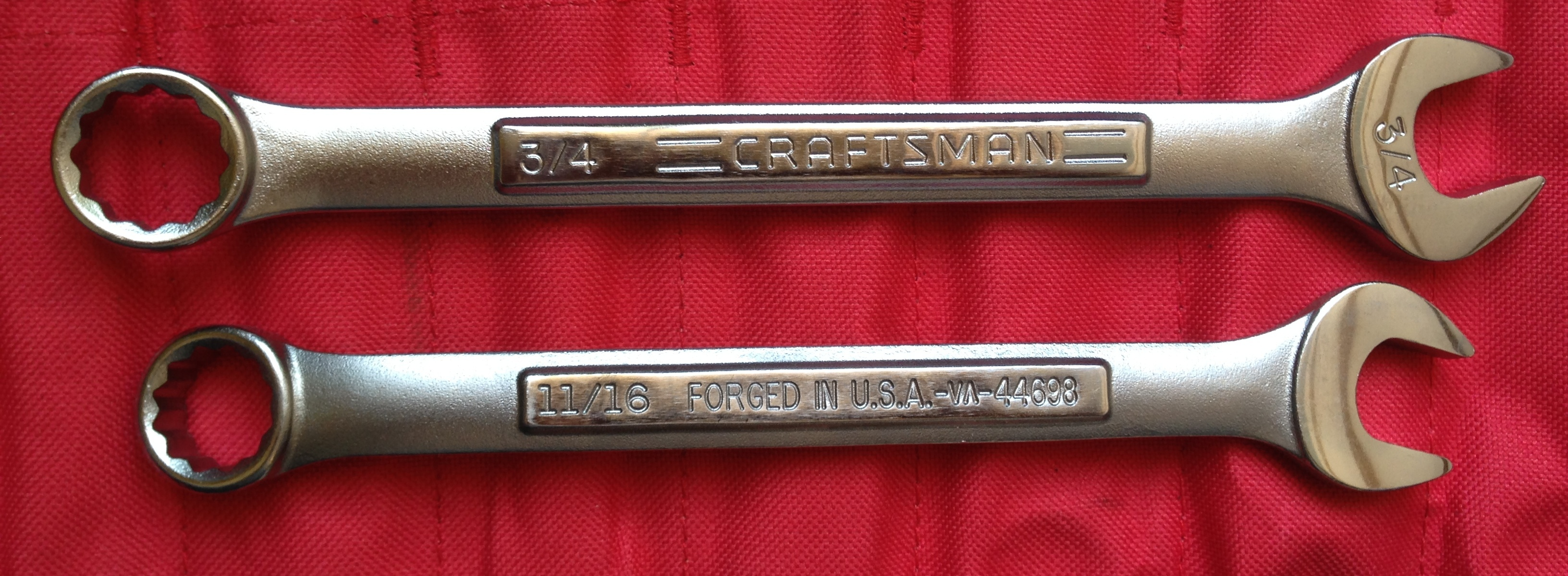
Raised panel combination wrenches

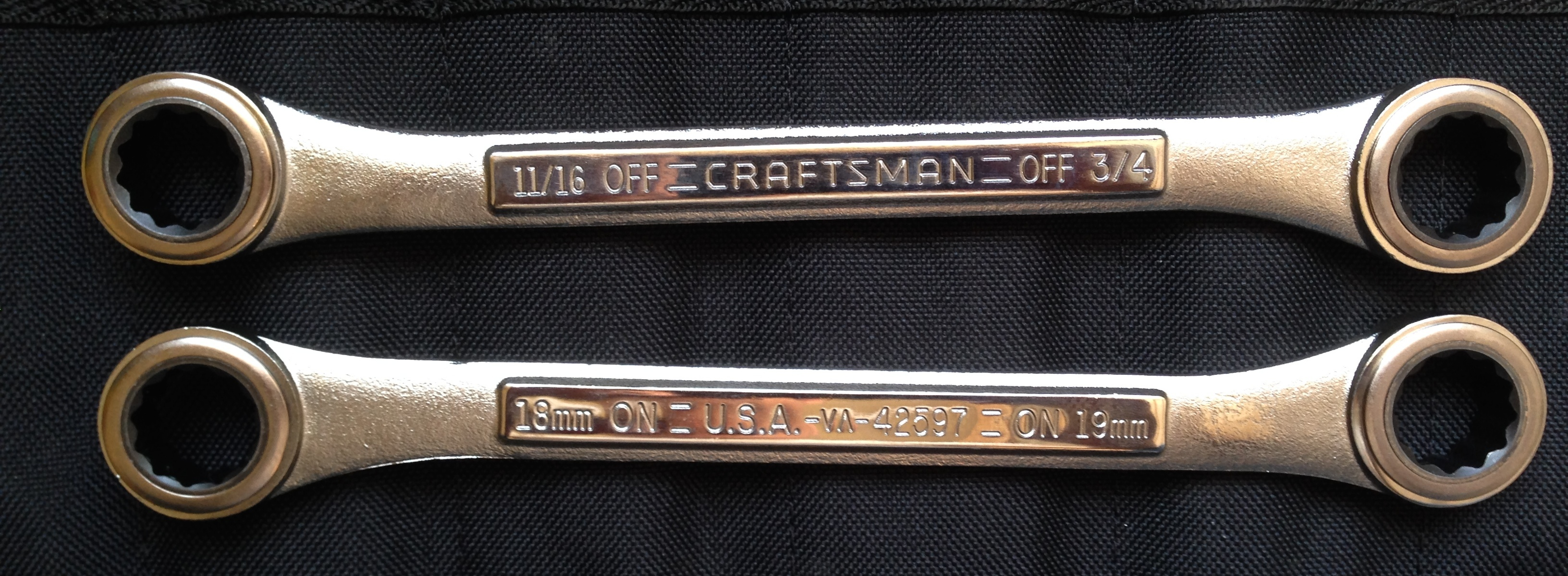
Double box-end ratcheting wrenches

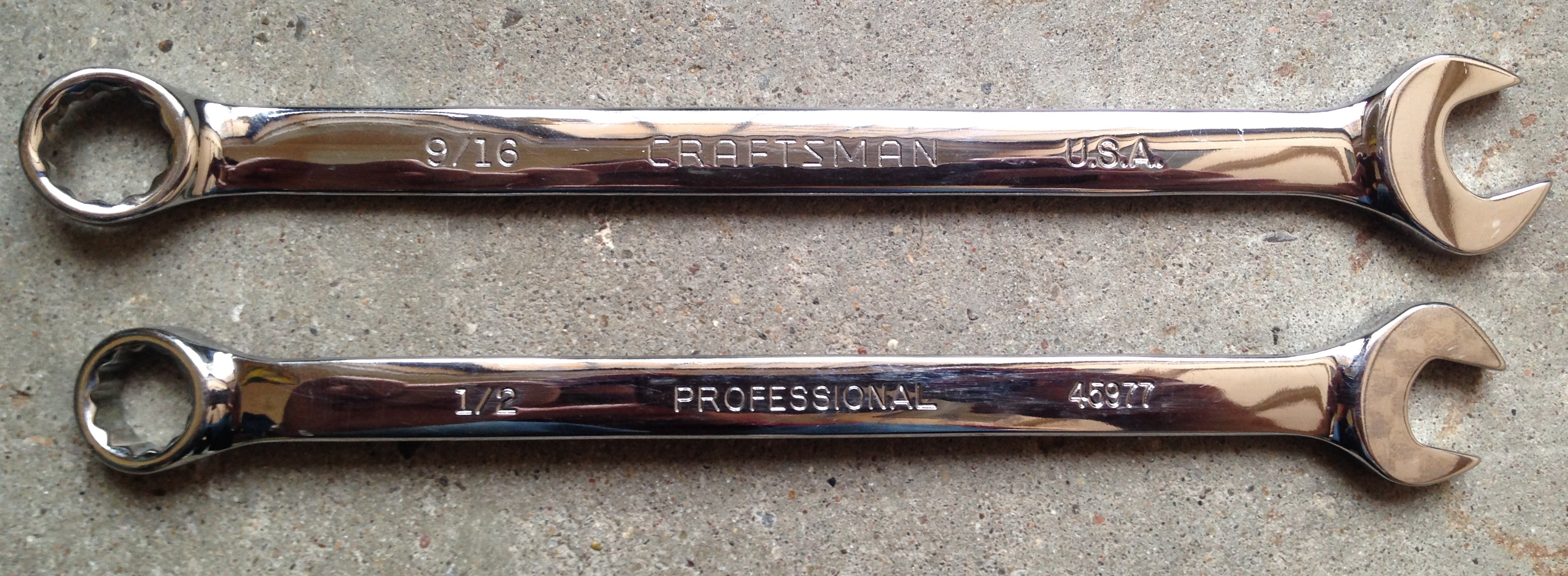
Craftsman Professional long pattern combination wrenches

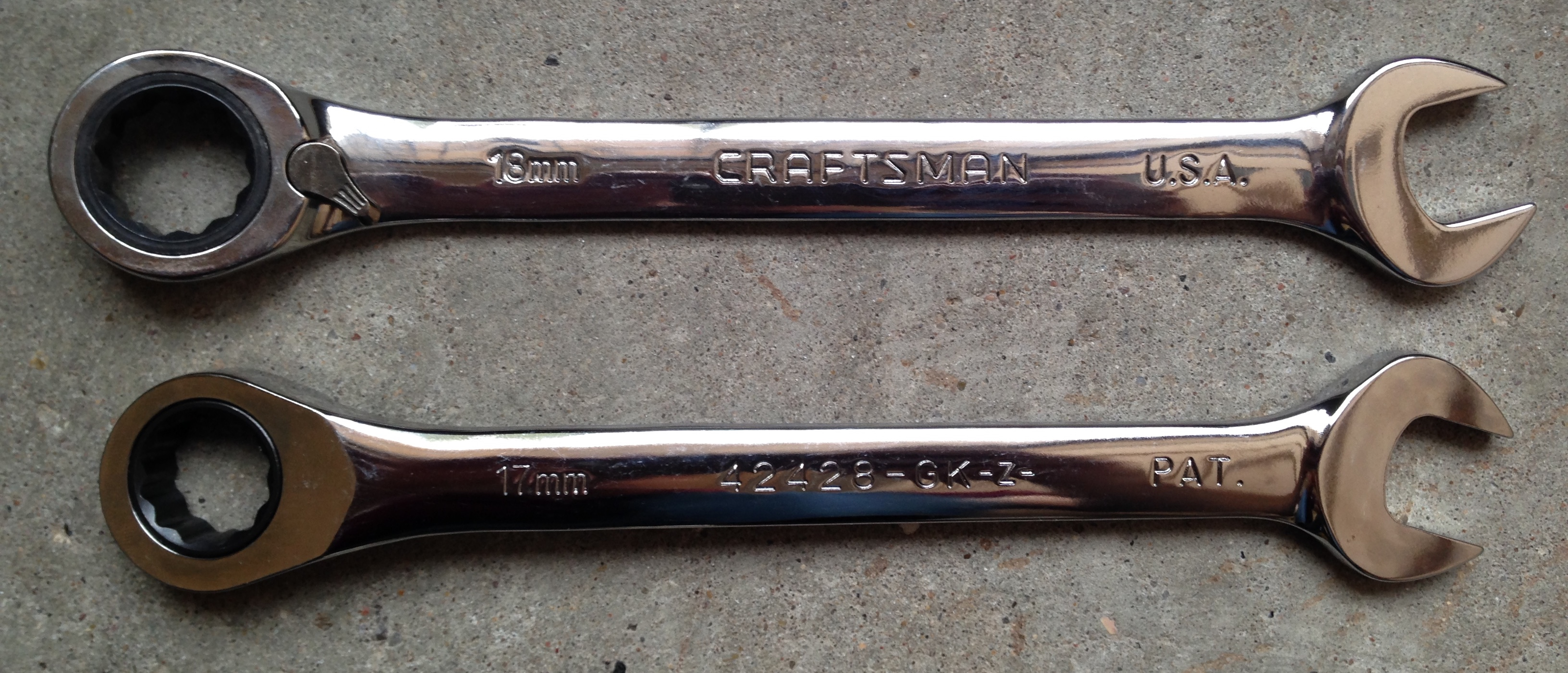
Craftsman Professional reversible ratcheting wrenches

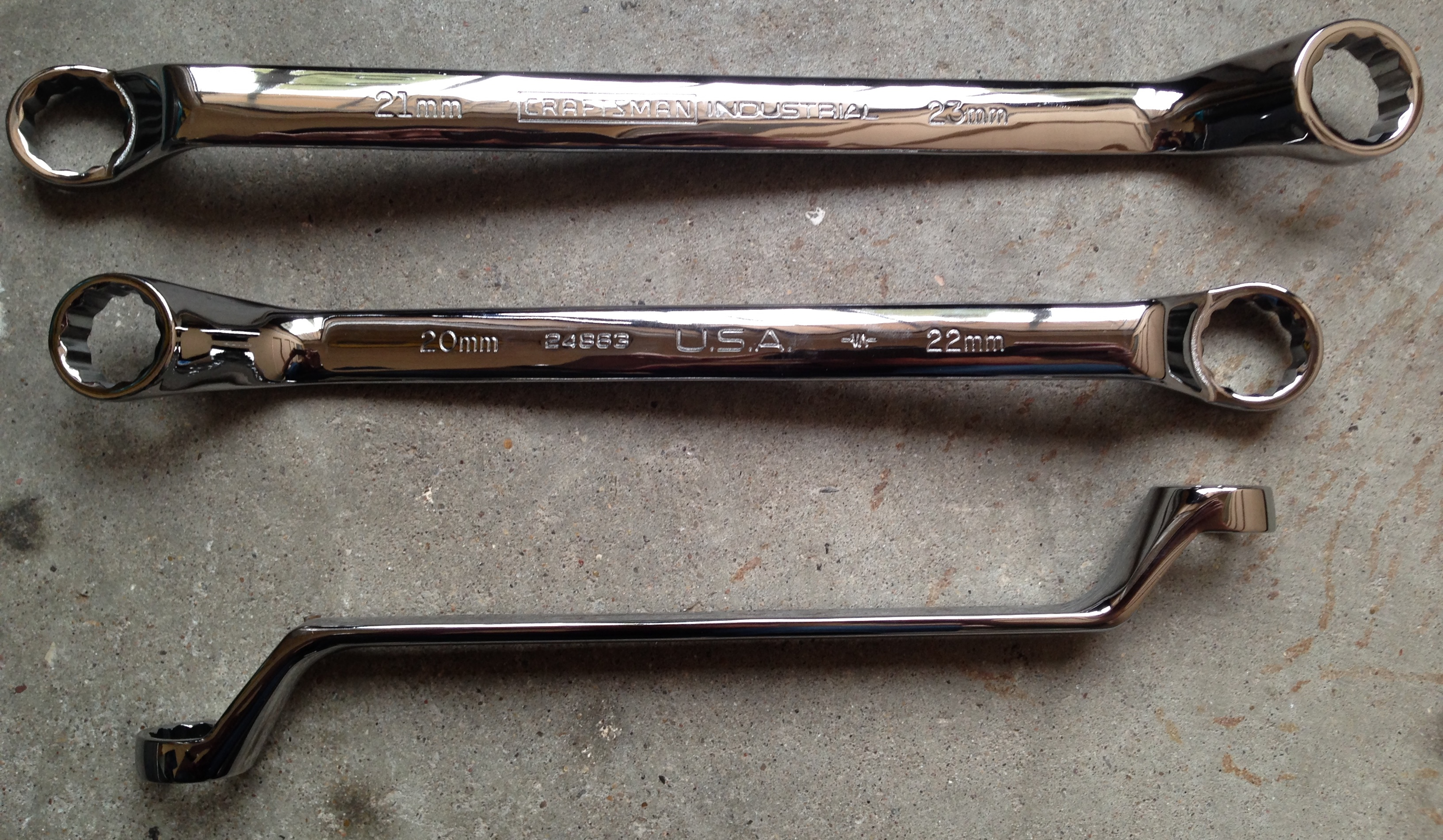
Craftsman Industrial deep offset wrenches

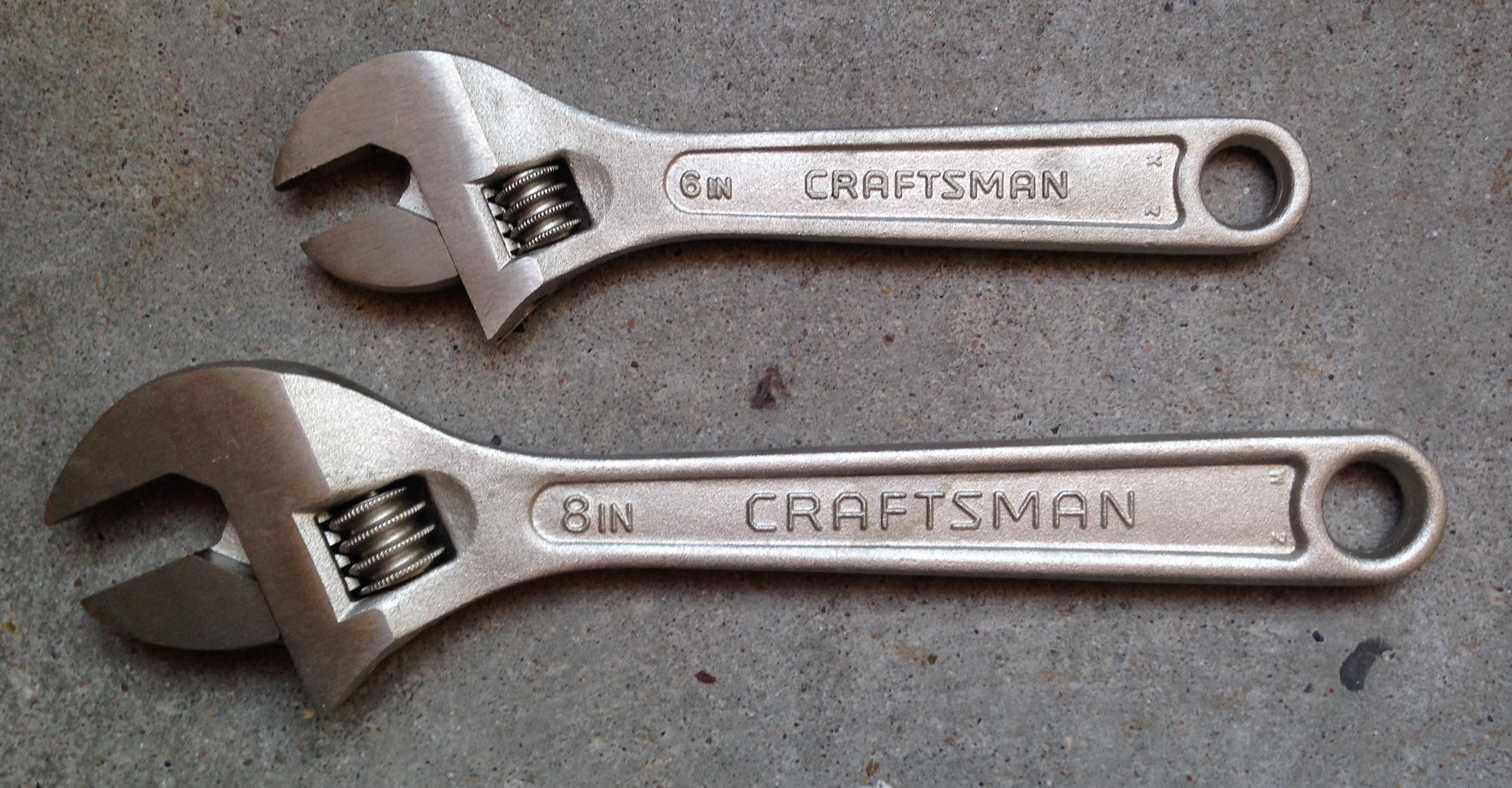
Two adjustable wrenches

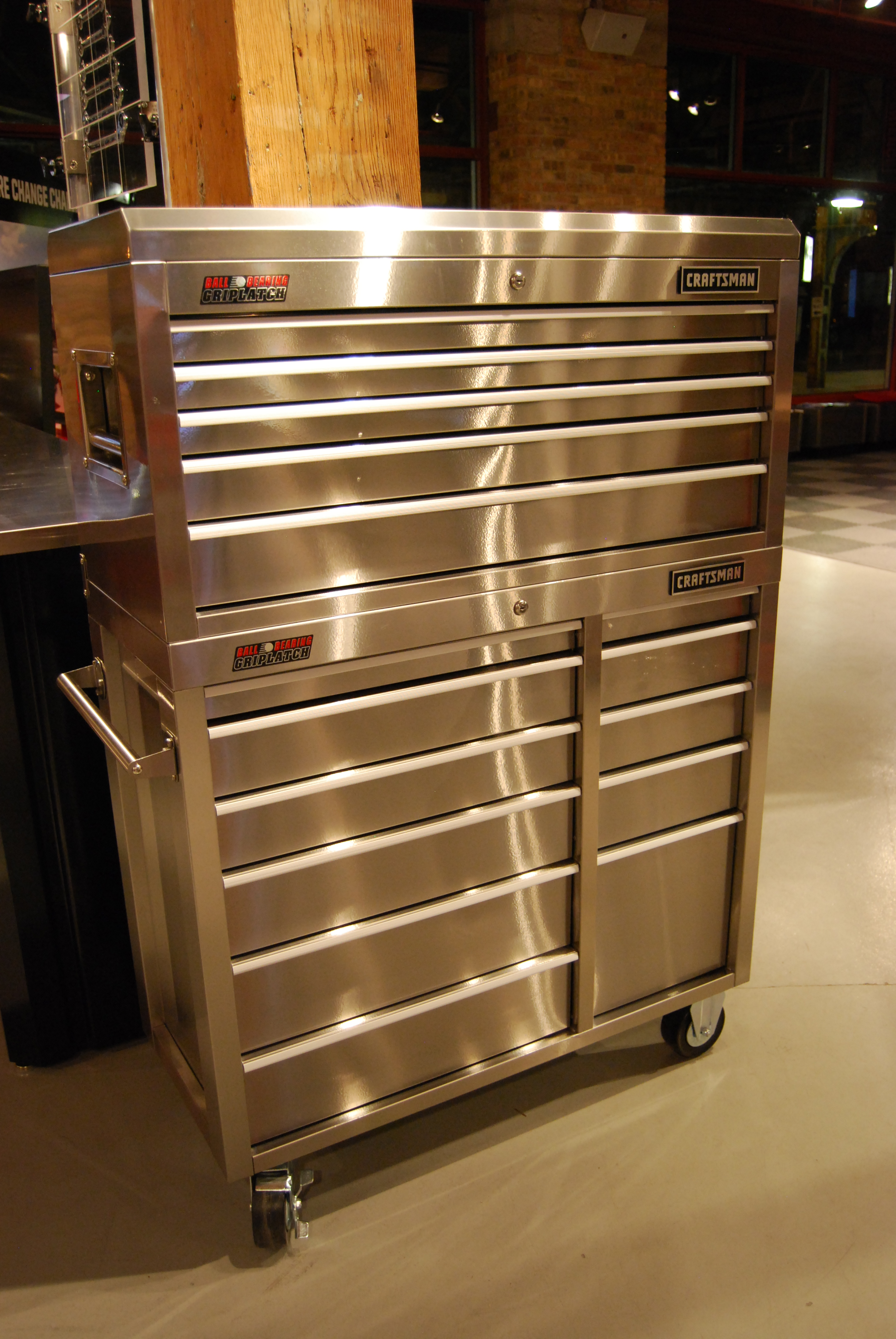
Craftsman tool chest
