= Lufkin (disambiguation) =

Lufkin may refer to:

- Lufkin, Texas, a city in Angelina County, Texas, United States
- Lufkin, Wisconsin, an unincorporated community, United States
- Lufkin Industries, manufacturing company based in Lufkin, Texas
- Lufkin (brand), a brand featuring primarily measurement tools
- Lufkin Foresters, former minor league baseball team based in Lufkin, Texas
- The Lufkin Daily News, newspaper that serves the city of Lufkin, Texas

== Education ==
- Lufkin High School
- Lufkin Independent School District
- Lufkin Road Middle School

== People ==
- Caroline Lufkin
- Olivia Lufkin
- Richard H. Lufkin (1851–1922), inventor of the vamp folding machine
- Sam Lufkin
- Willfred W. Lufkin
- Aaron Lufkin Dennison
- Abraham P. Lufkin, Galveston city councilmen and Lufkin, Texas was named after him
