= Vlchek Tool Company =

Defunct hand tool manufacturer

- Industry: Manufacturing
- Founded: 1894
- Defunct: 1958
- Fate: purchased
- Successor: Pendleton Tool Industries Co.
- Headquarters: 3001 East 87th Street, Cleveland, Ohio
- Key people: Frank J. Vlchek
- Products: Hand tools

Vlchek Tool Company was a hand tool manufacturer. Vlchek originally made and sharpened tools for stonecutters and masons, and later made tools for automobiles and for agriculture machinery.

Vlchek Tool Company was founded as a blacksmith shop in 1894 in Cleveland, Ohio by Frank J. Vlchek. It was incorporated in 1909.

In 1958 Pendleton Tool Industries Co. bought the Vlchek Tool Company. In 1964 Pendleton itself merged with Ingersoll-Rand. In 1969 Ingersoll closed Vlchek's plant on East 87th Street in Cleveland.

== See also ==
- List of defunct consumer brands
