= Murder of Alianna DeFreeze =

2017 murder of American child

Alianna DeFreeze
- Born: Alianna Serena DeFreeze; June 12, 2002; Detroit, Michigan, U.S.
- Died: January 26, 2017 (aged 14); Cleveland, Ohio, U.S.
- Cause of death: Stabbing
- Body discovered: January 29, 2017
- Resting place: Lake View Cemetery
- Known for: Being the inspiration and namesake of Alianna Alert

On January 26, 2017, Alianna DeFreeze, a fourteen-year-old girl from Cleveland, Ohio, was kidnapped, raped, tortured, and murdered by Christopher Whitaker. Whitaker, who had a criminal history involving grand theft, burglary, aggravated robbery, felonious assault, and sexual assault, took DeFreeze to an abandoned house, where he raped her. She was found beaten and stabbed to death using a hammer, a screwdriver, a nut driver, a box cutter, and a drill. DeFreeze, who attended school at E Prep & Village Prep Woodland Hills, was reported missing, causing a city-wide search. Her body was discovered three days later.

Whitaker's murder trial occurred in February 2018. Defense attorneys argued that Whitaker's drug use impaired his ability to control impulses and obey the law while prosecutors disagreed, saying that he knew what he was doing. The jury convicted Whitaker on February 13, 2018. Later, the jury recommended that Whitaker receive the death penalty and the judge upheld it. Whitaker is currently on death row.

In 2019, DeFreeze's parents filed a lawsuit against several people and entities arguing that the school's failure to notify them about their daughter's absence and the city's failure to monitor and prevent illicit activities in abandoned properties led to her death. In 2022, DeFreeze's family received a $1 million settlement. In 2019, Governor John Kasich signed a law named after DeFreeze, which requires schools to notify parents of unexcused absences within two hours.

== Background ==
=== Alianna DeFreeze ===
Alianna DeFreeze, the daughter of Damon DeFreeze and Donnesha Cooper, was a seventh-grader at E Prep & Village Prep Woodland Hills. She was fourteen years old and had a developmental disability. She would take the RTA bus to school, which her mother and grandmother did not like, though the fact that one stop was in front of a police station made them feel better about her means of transportation.

Alianna DeFreeze was the granddaughter of Donald DeFreeze, the founder and leader of the Symbionese Liberation Army, a left-wing militant group active in the early 1970s that gained notoriety for kidnapping Patty Hearst.

=== Christopher Whitaker ===
Christopher Whitaker

Christopher Whitaker (born January 29, 1973) was a native of Fayetteville, Tennessee with a long criminal record. His crimes and alleged crimes include:

- In 1998, he was charged with grand theft and burglary. He was also charged with aggravated robbery and felonious assault, though the case was dismissed.
- On April 8, 2005, he committed sexual battery and felonious assault against a woman in his home after letting her in so she could use the bathroom. According to the victim, he came out of the bathroom with a pair of scissors and began choking her. He proceeded to stab her in the neck with the scissors. She passed out and woke up on the floor with neck pain and with her pants and underwear removed. An evaluation determined that she had been sexually assaulted. Whitaker was sentenced to four years in prison for third-degree felony sexual battery and second-degree felonious assault. He was released in 2009 and was registered as a sex offender.
- In 2012 he was charged with aggravated theft.

== Crime ==
RTA surveillance footage recorded on the morning of January 26, 2017, shows DeFreeze exiting a bus, while surveillance video from a business shows her crossing East 93rd Street. She was then stopped outside the True Gospel Missionary Baptist Church by Whitaker, who, according to video recorded from the church, had been pacing around the area for several hours. DeFreeze took a step back from Whitaker, who followed her. According to a witness, Whitaker grabbed her as she walked along East 93rd Avenue. The witness did not contact the police because he was unsure of the relationship between DeFreeze and Whitaker. Surveillance video then shows Whitaker leading DeFreeze through a field to Fuller Avenue.

Whitaker took DeFreeze to an abandoned house. There, he raped her. Whitaker then used a Black and Decker drill, a Phillips-head screwdriver, a nut driver, a box cutter, and a hammer to stab and beat her to death. DeFreeze died as a result of the stab wounds and blunt force injuries which were numerous and severe.

Whitaker claimed he was high on cocaine and blacked out during the crime. After murdering DeFreeze, in the late morning hours, Whitaker assisted a pastor at the Golgatha Missionary Baptist Church to unload food pantry items from a truck. The pastor described Whitaker's demeanor as calm.

== Criminal proceedings ==
=== Investigation ===
Her mother became concerned at 4:00 pm when DeFreeze had still not returned home from school. She called E Prep and was informed that DeFreeze never arrived at school. DeFreeze was reported missing, prompting a city-wide search.

On January 29, DeFreeze's body was found at the house where Whitaker had murdered her by three Cleveland police officers. The officers entered the house after noticing that the back door was open and found a trail of blood leading from the dining room into a room behind a closed door. After kicking open the door, they found DeFreeze's deceased body crumpled in a corner in a pool of blood. She was naked except for her socks and had wounds to her head.

The boxcutter was used to slash DeFreeze's neck, while the drill had been used to put four puncture wounds into her cheek and a wound on her forehead that dislodged her right eyeball from the socket. Because many of the wounds showed signs that they had started healing, they were inflicted on her several hours before she died. DeFreeze appeared as if she had been dragged and thrown into the room. DeFreeze’s clothing, including a tie soaked with blood and a sweater torn open down the front, were found strewn about the house.

Along with DeFreeze's clothing, police also found her backpack and tools, including a drill, box cutter, a screwdriver, and a hammer, all of which had blood on them. The tools were laid out on a built-in bench in the dining room, which prosecutors described as a makeshift workstation.

DeFreeze’s body was identified using dental records by the medical examiner's office. An autopsy performed by Cuyahoga County Deputy Medical Examiner Dr. David Dolinak revealed that she suffered wounds caused by tools found in the house, including a drill, a screwdriver, and a box cutter. She had so many injuries and her injuries were so severe that Dolinak could not identify which one caused her death. Forensics analysts also found Whitaker's DNA on DeFreeze's body. Whitaker was identified using the DNA and was arrested at 7:00 pm on February 2 at the Villa Serena Apartments in Mayfield Heights with the assistance of U.S. Marshalls.

Whitaker was interrogated by Cleveland Police, and changed his story several times, initially denying any involvement in the murder and then going on to admit his involvement, but still denying responsibility by blaming his actions on crack-cocaine use. Whitaker said that he had blacked out after punching DeFreeze and that he would not have committed the crime if he were sober. "People are going to look at me like a monster. I'm not a monster,” he told investigators, adding that he was “just an addict who made a mistake that shouldn't have happened." Whitaker also told investigators that he did not want his face in the news.

=== Trial and death sentence ===
DeFreeze's murder trial began on February 1, 2018. Whitaker's defense attorneys acknowledged his crimes but said that his drug use made him less able to control his impulses and follow the law. Prosecutors disagreed, with assistant prosecutor Mahmoud Awadallah saying: “the evidence does not point to a drug-induced frenzy, does not point to a blackout. It points to that he knows what he was doing.” On February 13, 2018, Whitaker was found guilty of ten counts.

After convicting Whitaker jurors had to decide whether or not he should be sentenced to death or life in prison. On February 23, the jury recommended that he be put to death and Judge Carolyn Friedland agreed and formally sentenced him on March 26, saying that the mitigating circumstances "pale in comparison to the barbarity of the evidence."

DeFreeze's mother told the court that “death is too good for him, and I won’t believe he has any remorse until he suffers like my daughter suffered.” DeFreeze’s father told Whitaker “when you get where you’re going, you’re going to get what you got coming, before you get to the gas, lethal injection chamber, and that “my baby didn’t have a chance.” The woman Whitaker had attacked in 2005 supported his death sentence. Along with his death sentence, Whitaker was sentenced to forty-eight years in prison for aggravated burglary, felonious assault, rape, obstruction of justice, and gross abuse of a corpse.

=== Appeal ===
On August 22, 2022, the Ohio Supreme Court rejected Whitaker's appeal and upheld his death sentence. His execution is scheduled to take place in July 2026.

Whitaker is currently imprisoned on death row at the Ross Correctional Institution in Chillicothe, Ohio for aggravated burglary, kidnapping, rape, aggravated murder, tampering with evidence, and abuse of a corpse.

== Aftermath ==
Hundreds of people attended DeFreeze's funeral on February 11.

Shortly after the murder, DeFreeze's mother became homeless.

DeFreeze's family began a nonprofit foundation in her name called the Alianna DeFreeze Let's Make A Change Foundation. The foundation works to address the issues of abandoned homes, help children obtain safe routes to school, and address domestic violence, homelessness, and police-community relations.

In January 2019, DeFreeze's parents filed a wrongful death lawsuit in the Cuyahoga County Court of Common Pleas naming the Cleveland Metropolitan School District, E Prep and Village Prep Woodland Hills, Friends of Breakthrough Schools, the City of Cleveland, the man who owned the abandoned house where the crime occurred, murderer Christopher Whittaker, and others as defendants. The lawsuit claimed that there was a system in place in which administrators at E Prep would send an automated message notification to parents to alert them about news involving their children, including unexcused absences. DeFreeze's parents were signed up to receive text messages in the case of their daughter's unexcused absence but did not receive any such notification, only finding out about her absence at 4:00 pm after she did not make it home.

The lawsuit alleged that the school was aware of DeFreeze's absence but did not contact her parents. If DeFreeze's parents had been notified immediately or within a reasonable time, she might have been located before being raped, tortured, and murdered. The lawsuit also alleged that the school lied when they said they tried to send an alert but failed and that they should have been immediately concerned about DeFreeze's absence because of her developmental disability and because it was uncharacteristic of her to miss school. The lawsuit stated that because of the defendants' negligence, DeFreeze's last hours "were spent in excruciating, paralyzing, debilitating and unthinkable physical and mental pain."

The lawsuit also claimed that the City of Cleveland and city employees failed to monitor abandoned properties and prevent illicit activities from occurring in them and named the owner of the house where the murder occurred, saying that he failed to maintain, operate and monitor it. DeFreeze's family sought $15 million in damages. In March 2019, the DeFreezes filed an amended complaint, which E Prep moved to dismiss. E Prep argued that it was immune from liability due to its status as a political subdivision. The trial court denied the motion, and E Prep appealed to Ohio's Court of Appeals for the Eighth District, which ruled in their favor. In January 2022, DeFreeze’s family received a $1 million settlement in connection with the lawsuit filed against her school and the city.

In January 2019, Ohio Governor John Kasich signed the Alianna Alert bill after it passed the House of Representatives 85–4. The law requires schools to call parents within 120 minutes of the start of the school day if their child is absent without the parents having previously notified the school. It went into effect in April 2019. DeFreeze's mother also expressed an interest in having more police protect the streets.

== See also ==
- List of kidnappings
- List of solved missing person cases (post-2000)
