= Easco Hand Tools =

Former manufacturing company

- Type: Privately held company
- Industry: Manufacturing
- Predecessor: Moore Drop Forging Company
- Founded: 1901
- Defunct: 1990
- Fate: Acquired by Danaher Corporation
- Headquarters: Hunt Valley, Maryland, United States
- Products: Hand tools

Easco Hand Tools was an American manufacturer of hand tools. It is best known for being the main supplier of mechanic's tools for the Craftsman brand. Its tools were also sold under the Allen and KD Tools brands after its acquisition by Danaher Corporation. The brand name was gradually phased out by Danaher.

== History ==
The company began as Moore Drop Forging Company in Springfield, Massachusetts in 1900 or 1901.

In 1938 Moore became a vendor for Sears Roebuck.

In 1967, Moore Drop Forging was acquired by Eastern Stainless Steel Corporation (Easco), a manufacturer of stainless and specialty steel. Easco continued the Craftsman contract with Sears. By 1969, the parent company was known as Easco Corporation. Tools made by MDF for Sears have a "V" maker's mark on them, those by Danaher had a "V^" (V and upside down V, sometimes a right-side up V). Variations of the "VV" exist including three digit codes on tools such as ratchets. It is believed that these denote the time frame of manufacture, as well as the plant that made them. "V" typically meant the tool was made in the Springfield, MA plant, "VV" typically meant it was made in the Springdale, AR plant and "G" meant it was made in the Gastonia, NC plant. This has been confirmed with various plant employees who worked at these facilities.

In 1985, Easco Corporation was acquired via a hostile takeover by Equity Group Holdings, controlled by the investment brothers Steven Rales and Mitchell Rales and taken private. The hand tools division of the company was taken public, and the other divisions were sold to an investment group including Citicorp Venture Capital.

In 1990, the hand tool company was acquired by the brothers' Danaher Corporation. This acquisition made the tools division the largest part of Danaher. In 1991, Sears selected Danaher to be the exclusive supplier of Craftsman mechanic's tools.

In 2010, Danaher merged its tools division with Cooper Tools to form Apex Tool Group. In 2013, Apex closed the Gastonia, North Carolina plant where Easco manufactured sockets since 1978.

== Gallery ==
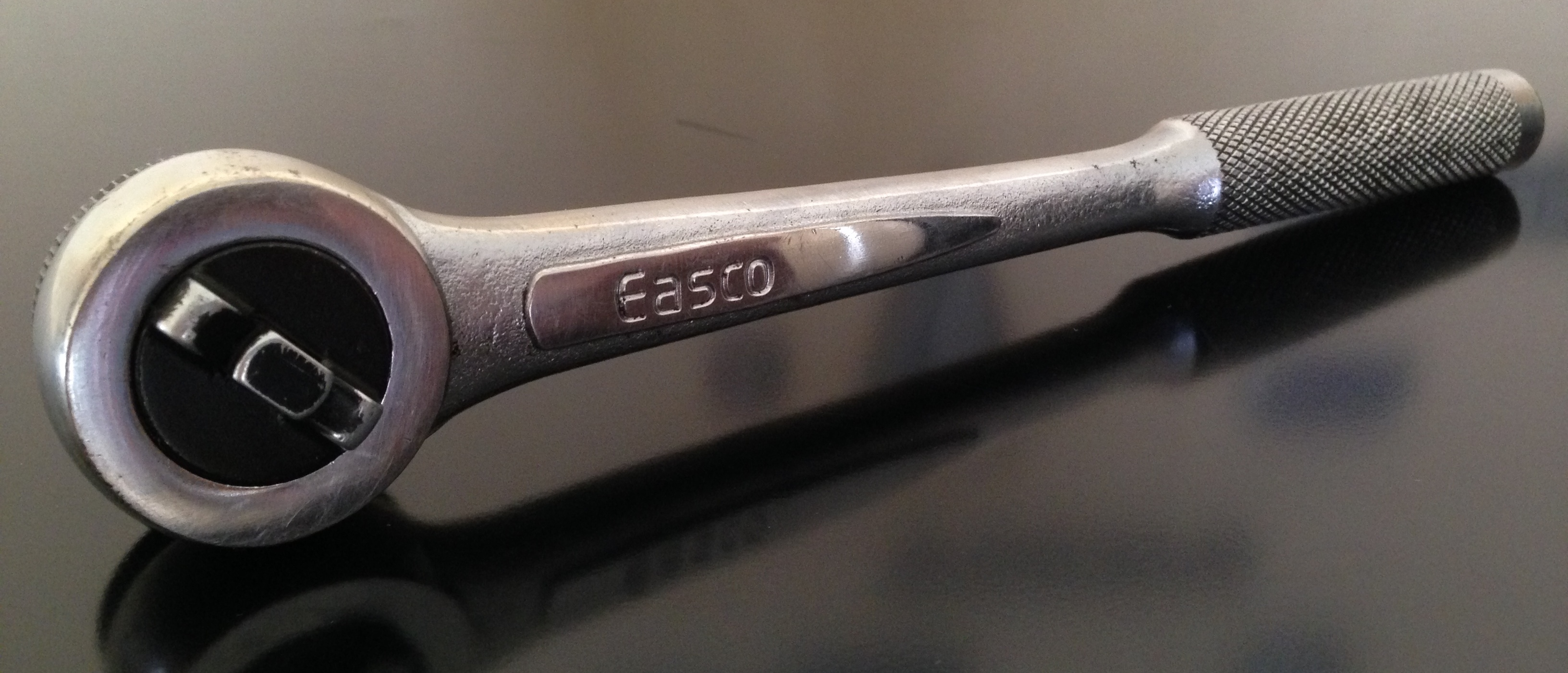
An Easco ratchet.

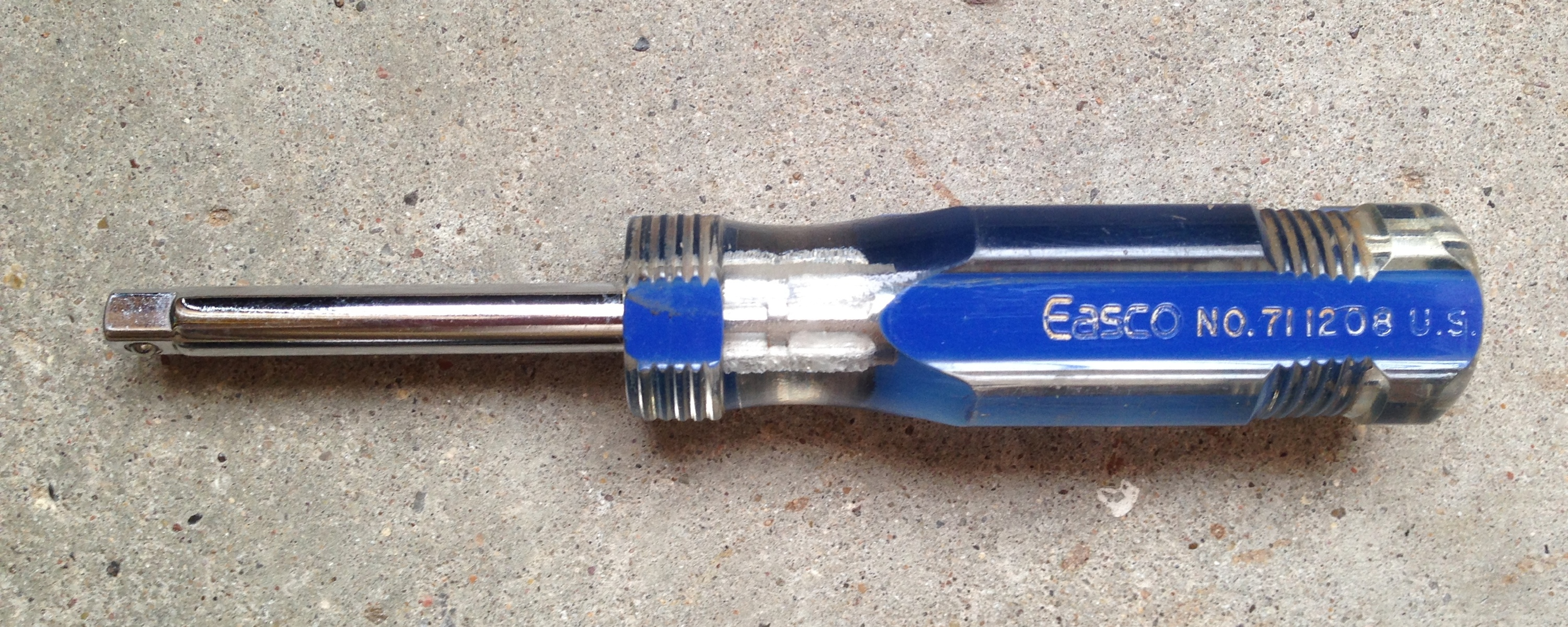
An Easco spinner handle.
