= Plumb (tools) =

Brand of hand tools

- Product type: Hand tools
- Current owner: Apex Tool Group
- Country: USA
- Introduced: c. 1888

Plumb is a brand of hand tools owned by Apex Tool Group. The brand is known for its hammers and hatchets.

== History ==
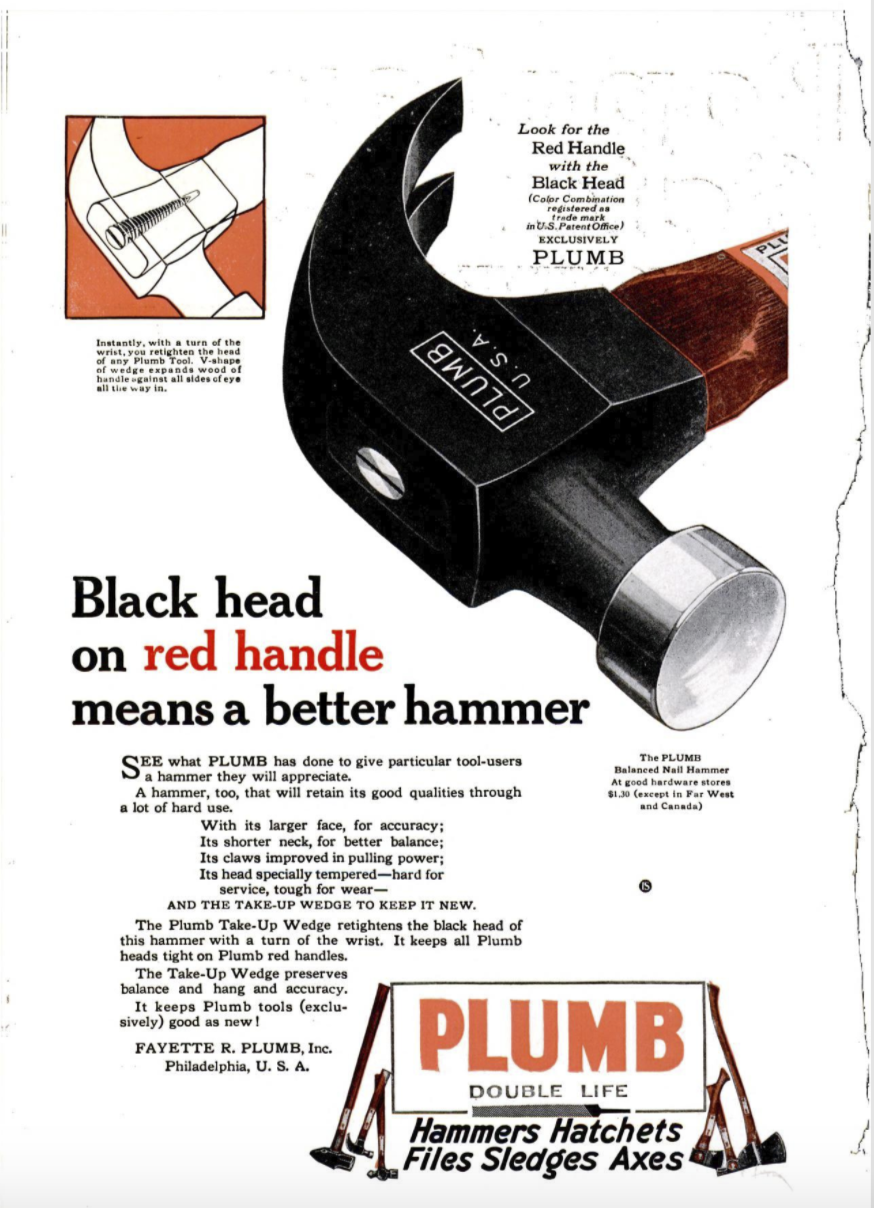
1925 advertisement for Plumb-brand hammers

In 1869, Fayette R. Plumb entered a partnership with Jonathan Yerkes, an established hammer manufacturer operating in the Frankford neighborhood of Philadelphia. Shortly thereafter, a new facility was built in the Bridesburg neighborhood of that city, operating as Yerkes & Plumb. The firm was one of the first in the United States to use cast steel to manufacture tools. Yerkes retired in April 1886, and Plumb bought out Yerkes' interest in the company the following year. By 1888, the company was operating solely under the Plumb name.

In 1926, Plumb objected to an attempt by the similarly named Plomb Tool Company to register its name as a trademark. The companies negotiated an agreement, but in 1946, Plumb sued for trademark infringement because Plomb had violated the terms of this agreement. The Plomb company began selling tools under the Proto name instead.

In 1971, the Plumb Company was acquired by the Ames Company. In 1981, Plumb was sold to Cooper Industries; in 2010, the Cooper Hand Tools division was spun off into Apex Tool Group.
