= Armstrong Tools =

American industrial tool manufacturer

- Type: Subsidiary of Apex Tool Group
- Industry: Manufacturing
- Founded: 1890 in Chicago, Illinois
- Headquarters: Chicago, Illinois
- Products: Industrial tools
- Website: www.armstrongtools.com

Armstrong Tools was an American industrial hand tool manufacturer. In its final years, it existed as a brand of Apex Tool Group, LLC and manufactured the majority of its tools in the United States, focusing mostly on aerospace, government, and military users.

== History ==
Armstrong was founded in 1890 as the Armstrong Bros. Tool Company in Chicago, Illinois by the five Armstrong brothers. The brothers manufactured bicycle parts and tools for repairing and manufacturing bicycles from the brothers' backyard shed and managed a retail store in downtown Chicago.

In 1895, Armstrong introduced a tool holder for lathe cutting bits. Rather than individual forged cutting tools, this product used a single forged shank with interchangeable cutting bits, drastically reducing the cost of such bits. The success of this product allowed Armstrong to build a factory in Chicago in 1900 (followed by a larger factory in 1905). In 1948, the company moved to its current facility, and in 1974, it opened a second facility in Fayetteville, Arkansas. Some Sears Craftsman Professional products lines (such as the former USA made Professional wrench line) were made by the Armstrong Division of Danaher and were virtually the same units, save for the stamping of the different names.

In 1994, Armstrong was acquired by the Danaher Corporation, where it operated as its industrial hand tools division.

In 2010, Armstrong, as part of Danaher Tool Group, became part of Apex Tool Group. In 2017, Apex announced that it would layoff 170 workers at its Sumter, South Carolina plant and cease production of the Armstrong and Allen brands by March 31.
