= Can wrench =

Tool used when working on telephone distribution terminals

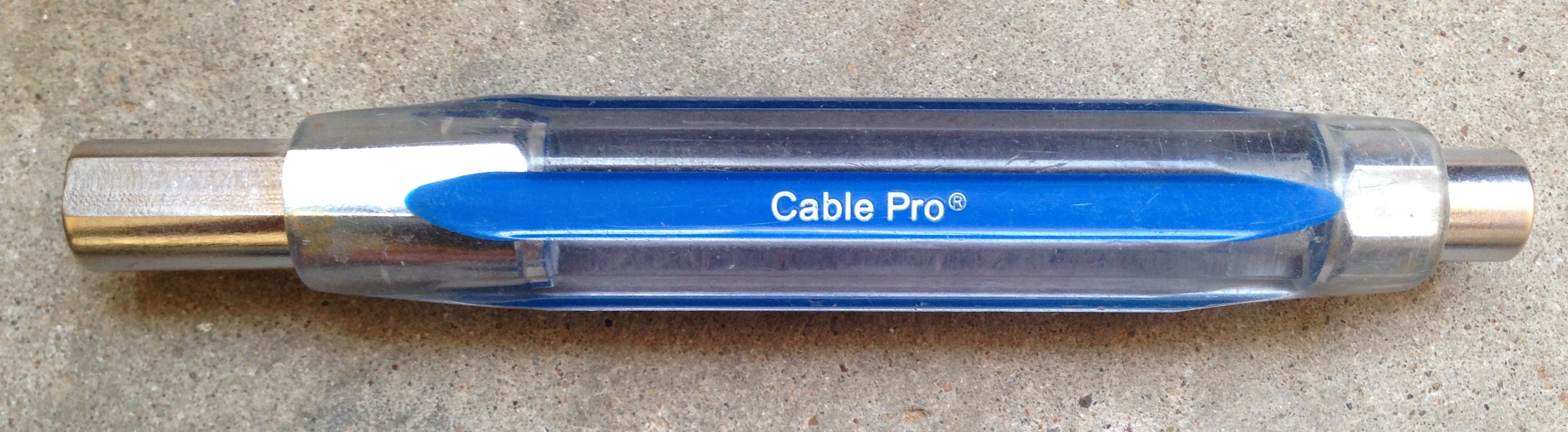

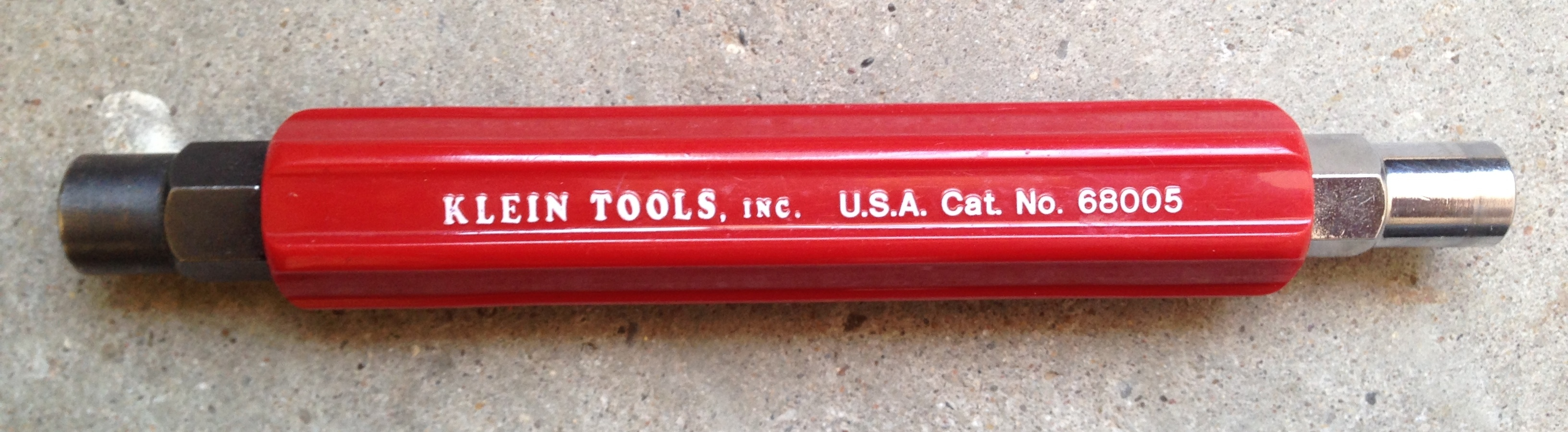
Can wrenches

A can wrench is a wrench made to open a telephone distribution terminal also called a telco can or demarcation point box. One end of the can wrench is a 7/16 inch hex socket used for recessed fasteners on closures, and the other end is a 3/8 inch hex socket for use on binding posts. The wrench is also referred to as a 216C tool which was the Bell System specification version. They are often insulated against electric shock. The hex socket on each end is a thin wall thickness to allow the outside diameter to be placed into the tight recessed access often found on telco cans and demarc boxes.

== See also ==
- Socket wrench
- Nut driver
