= Xcelite =

American supplier of hand tools

- Product type: Hand tools
- Current owner: Apex Tool Group
- Country: USA
- Previous owners: Cooper Industries
- Website: Weller Xcelite Tools

Xcelite is a brand of hand tools geared towards the electronics service industry. It is currently owned by Apex Tool Group and markets screwdrivers, nut drivers, pliers, and various specialized electronics tools.

== History ==
Xcelite was founded in 1921 by F. Birney Farrington (1886-1962), as the Park Metalware Company, Inc., a small metalworking shop in Orchard Park, New York. John Zilliox’s (1874-1971) U.S. patent 1,386,217 for an adjustable wrench, launched the company into manufacturing hand tools for worldwide distribution. The company marketed tools under the "XCEL" and, later, "Xcelite" brand names. John N. Petre (1891-1952) held six patents assigned to Park Metalware. Among his important inventions was the interchangeable shaft screwdriver U.S. patent 2,476,762. By 1952, the Xcelite brand name was so well known in the electronics, television and radio repair industries, the company changed its corporate name to Xcelite, Inc.

In 1973, the brand was purchased by Cooper Industries.

In 2010, the brand was transferred to Apex Tool Group, a joint venture formed by Cooper Industries and Danaher Corporation.

== Gallery ==
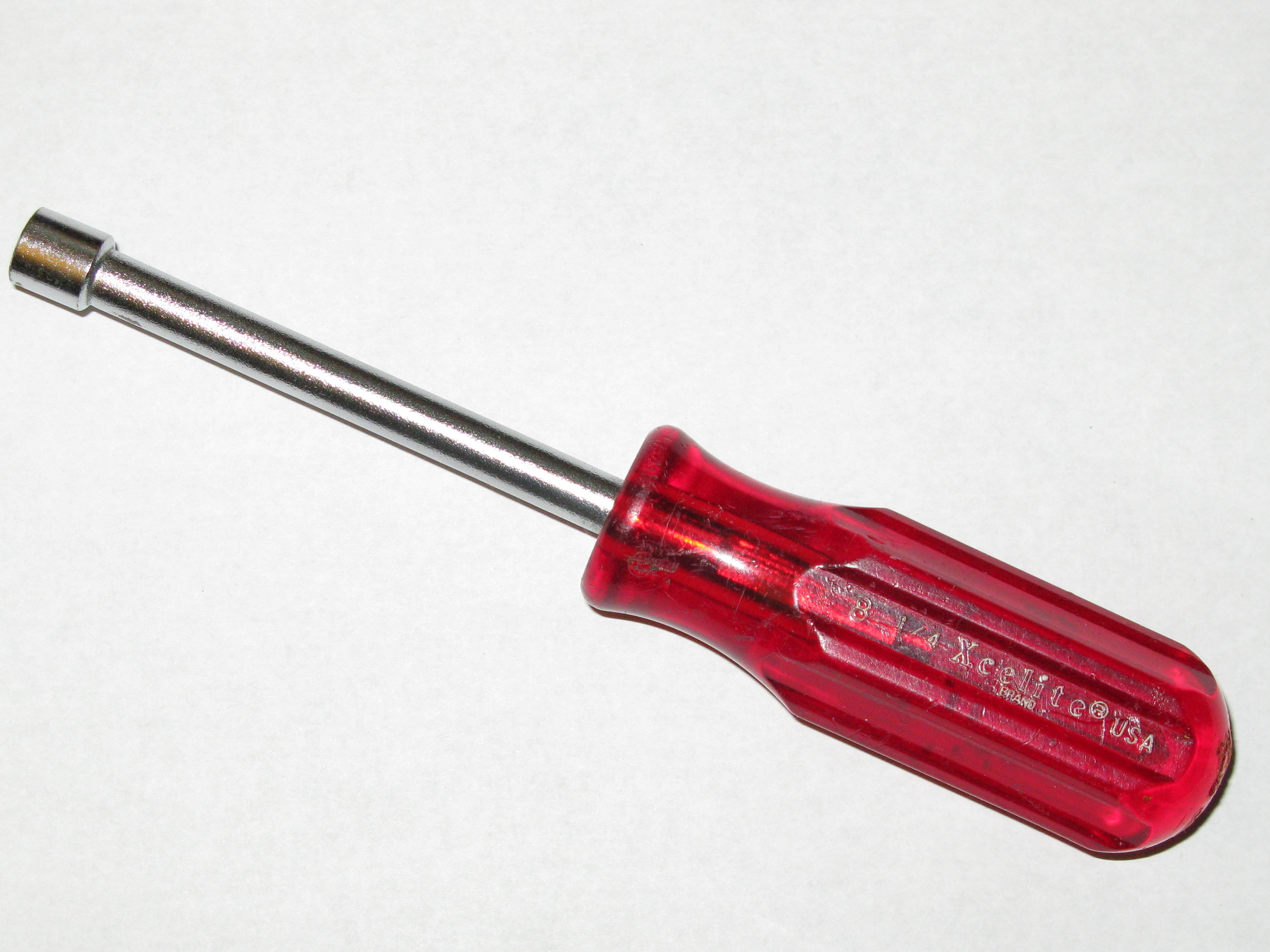
An Xcelite nut driver.

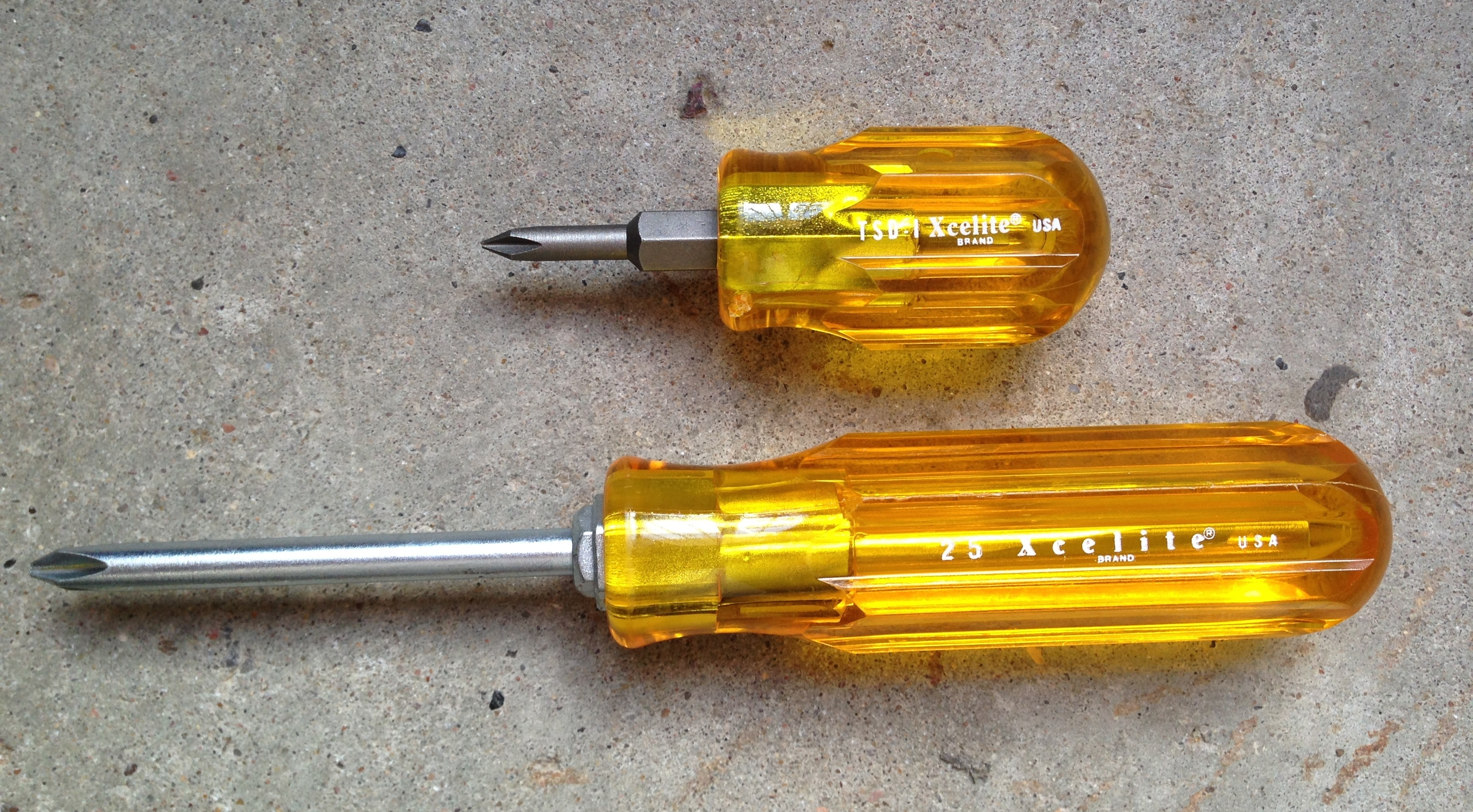
Standard-length and "stubby" interchangeable shaft screwdrivers.

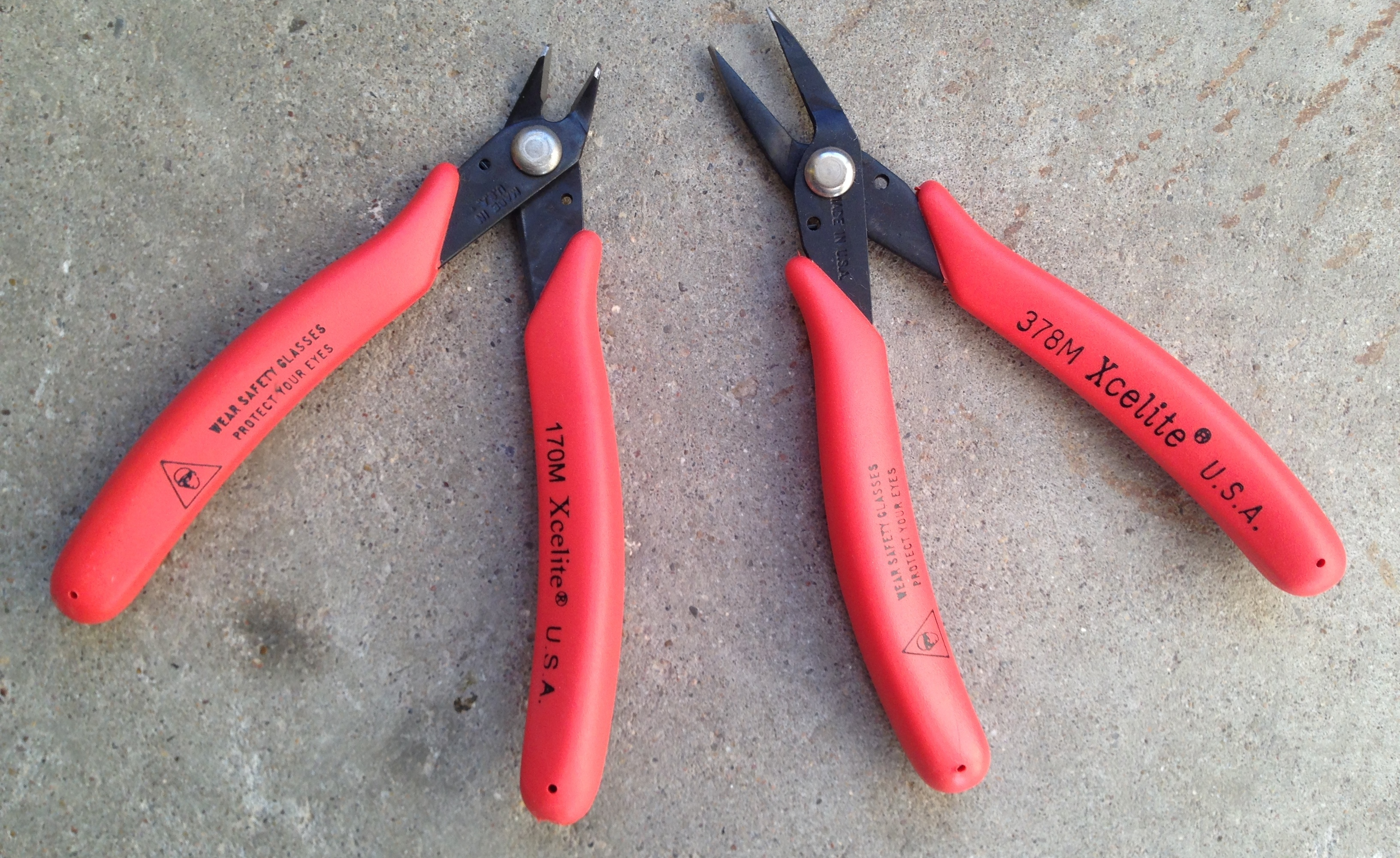
Precision pliers.

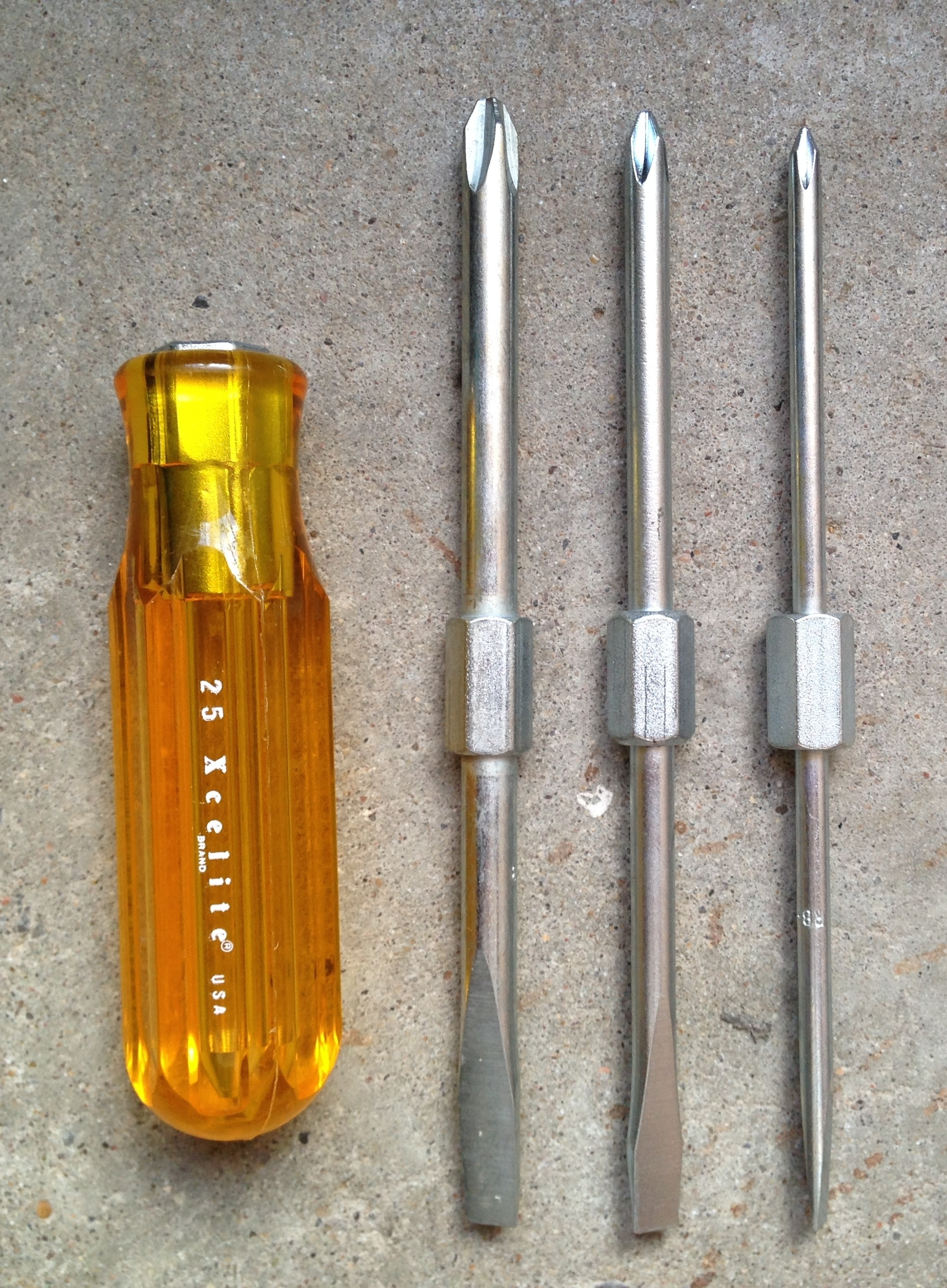
Xcelite interchangeable shaft screwdriver

== See also ==
- Monkey wrench
- Nut driver
- Pliers
