= Richard H. Lufkin =

American inventor of the vamp folding machine (c.1851–1922)

- Born: c. 1851; Charlestown, Massachusetts, United States
- Died: 1922; Roxbury, Massachusetts, United States
- Resting place: Forest Hills Cemetery, Boston
- Occupation: Inventor
- Known for: Vamp folding machine
- Awards: Gold Medal, World's Columbian Exposition (1893)

Richard H. Lufkin (Charlestown, c. 1851 – Roxbury, 1922) was a Massachusetts inventor of a piece of shoemaking machinery, the vamp folding machine.

== Information ==
Lufkin won a gold medal for the vamp folding machine at the World's Columbian Exposition in 1893. Lufkin's mausoleum at the Forest Hills Cemetery in Boston is known for its depiction of a vamp folding machine above the entrance, carved in granite, and for the stained glass portrait of Lufkin in the interior, holding his vamp folding machine.

A fund supporting equipment for education in Mechanical Engineering, the Richard H. Lufkin Memorial Fund, was established in memory of Richard Lufkin. The award has been used by many local universities to improve educational laboratories related to Mechanical Engineering.
