= Proto (tools) =

American tool company

- Type: Subsidiary
- Industry: Manufacturing
- Founded: Los Angeles, California, United States (1907)
- Founder: Alphonse Plomb; Jacob Weninger; Charles Williams
- Headquarters: New Britain, Connecticut, United States
- Products: Industrial tools
- Parent: Stanley Black & Decker
- Website: protoindustrial.com

Proto Tools (formally Stanley Proto) is an American industrial hand tool company. Founded as Plomb, it is presently a division of Stanley Black & Decker. The company is credited with creating the first combination wrench in 1933.

== History ==
Established by Alphonse Plomb, Jacob Weninger, and Charles Williams as the Plomb Tool Company, the company started in 1907 as a small blacksmith shop making chisels in Los Angeles. In 1933, Plomb released what is commonly credited as the first combination wrench.

Plomb acquired a number of companies during the 1940s, including Cragin Tool of Chicago, Illinois in 1940, P&C Tool of Oregon in 1941, Penens Tool of Cleveland, Ohio in 1942, and J.P. Danielson of Jamestown, New York in 1947. Penens Tool would produce tools under the Fleet and Challenger brand names after its acquisition.

In 1946, Plomb was sued by another tool manufacturer—Fayette R. Plumb, Inc., now a brand of Apex Tool Group—for trademark infringement. The company began manufacturing its tools with the Proto name, a portmanteau of "professional" and "tools," in 1948. In 1957, the company began operating as Pendleton Tool Industries.

In 1964, Proto was acquired by Ingersoll-Rand, and in 1984, it was acquired by Stanley and became Stanley Proto Industrial Tools.

== Gallery ==
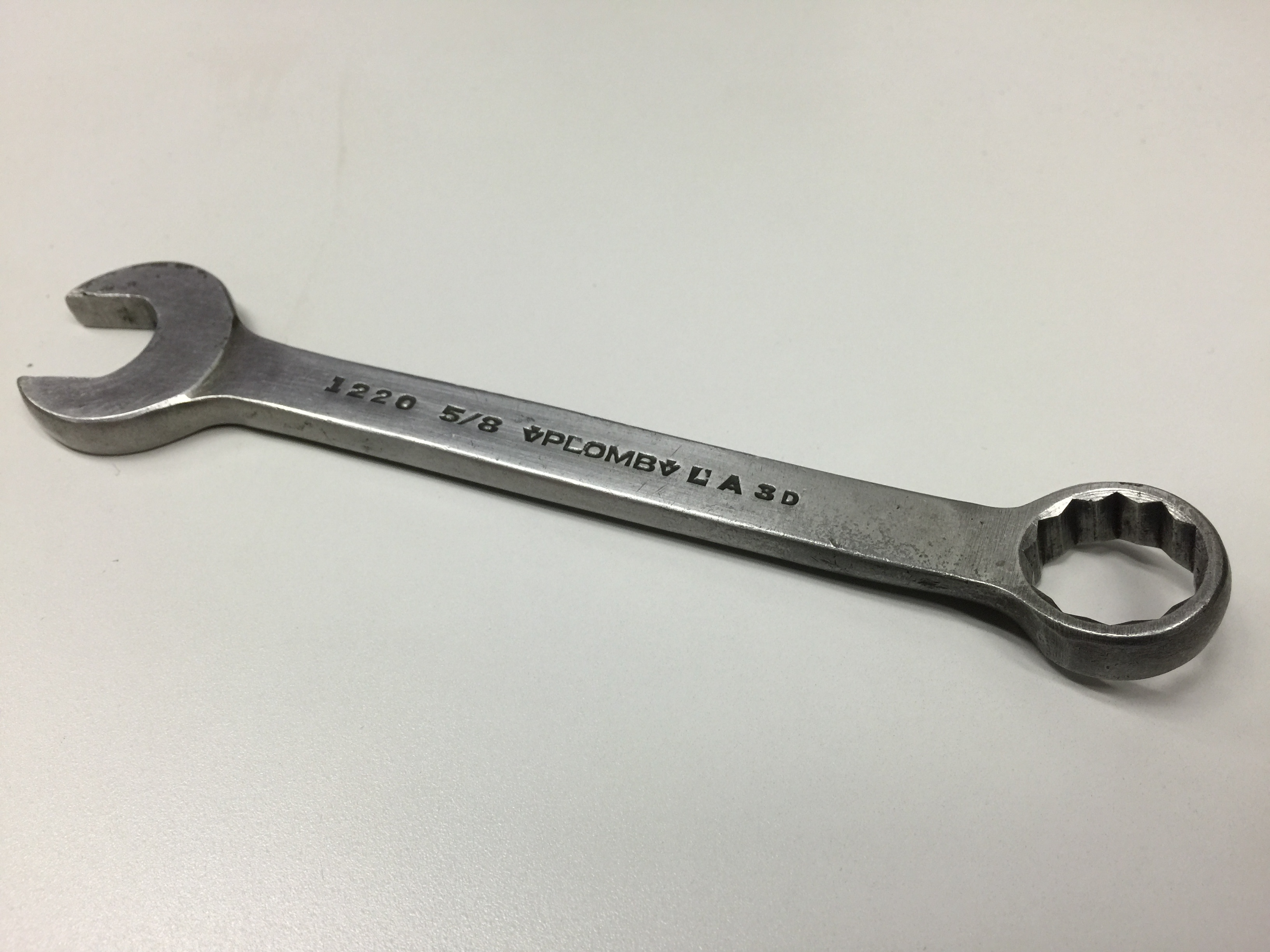
A 1933 5/8" Plomb combination wrench.

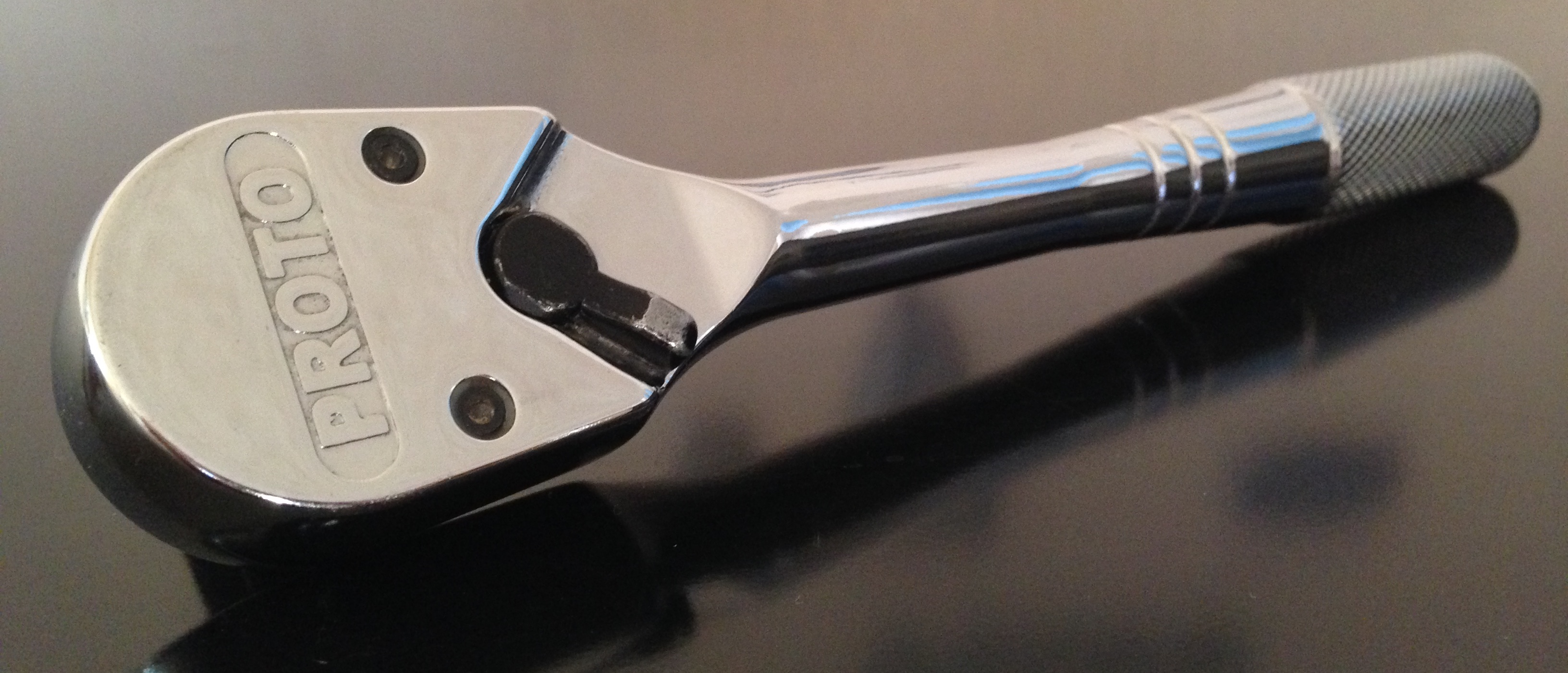
A Proto "Big Dawg" ratchet.

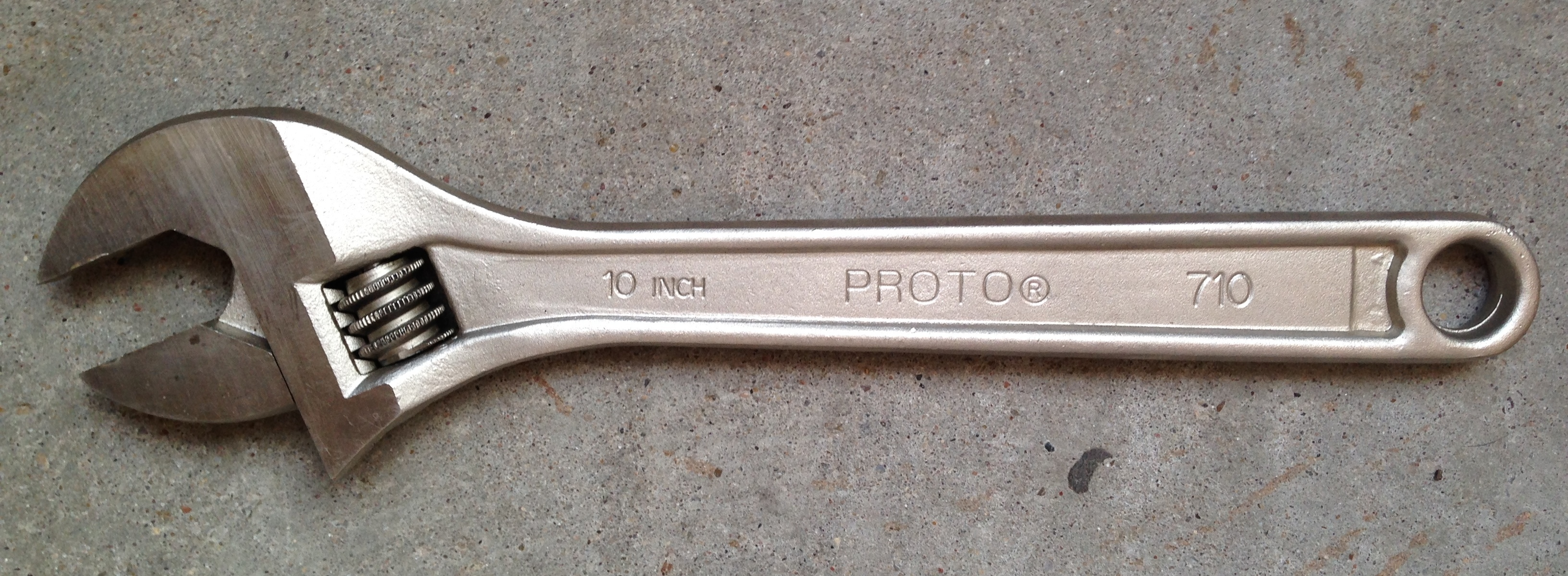
A Proto adjustable wrench.

== See also ==
- Blackhawk by Proto
