= Nut driver =

Hand tool for nuts and bolts, similar to a screwdriver

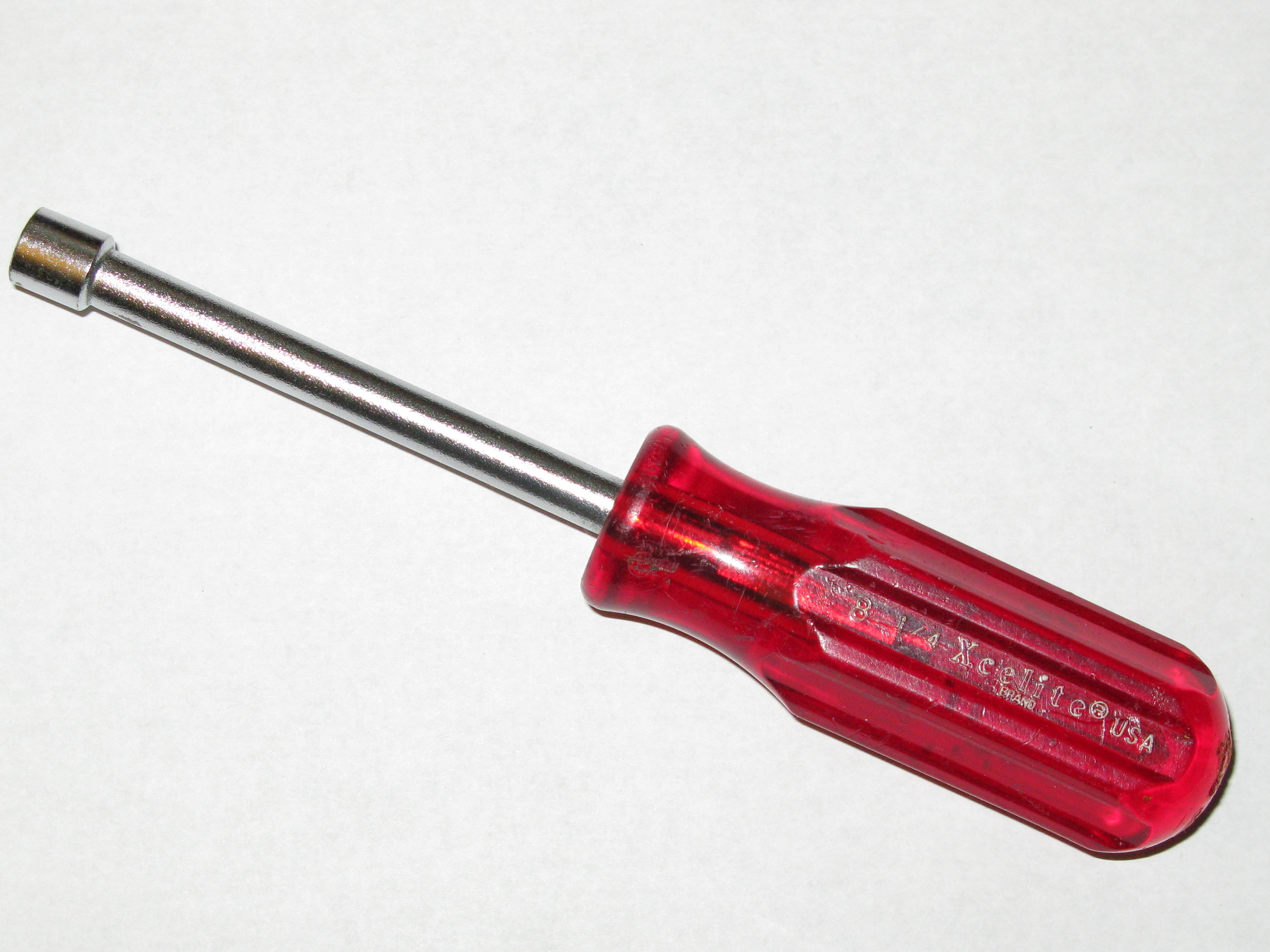
A 1/4 in (6.35 mm) Xcelite nut driver with a fixed socket.

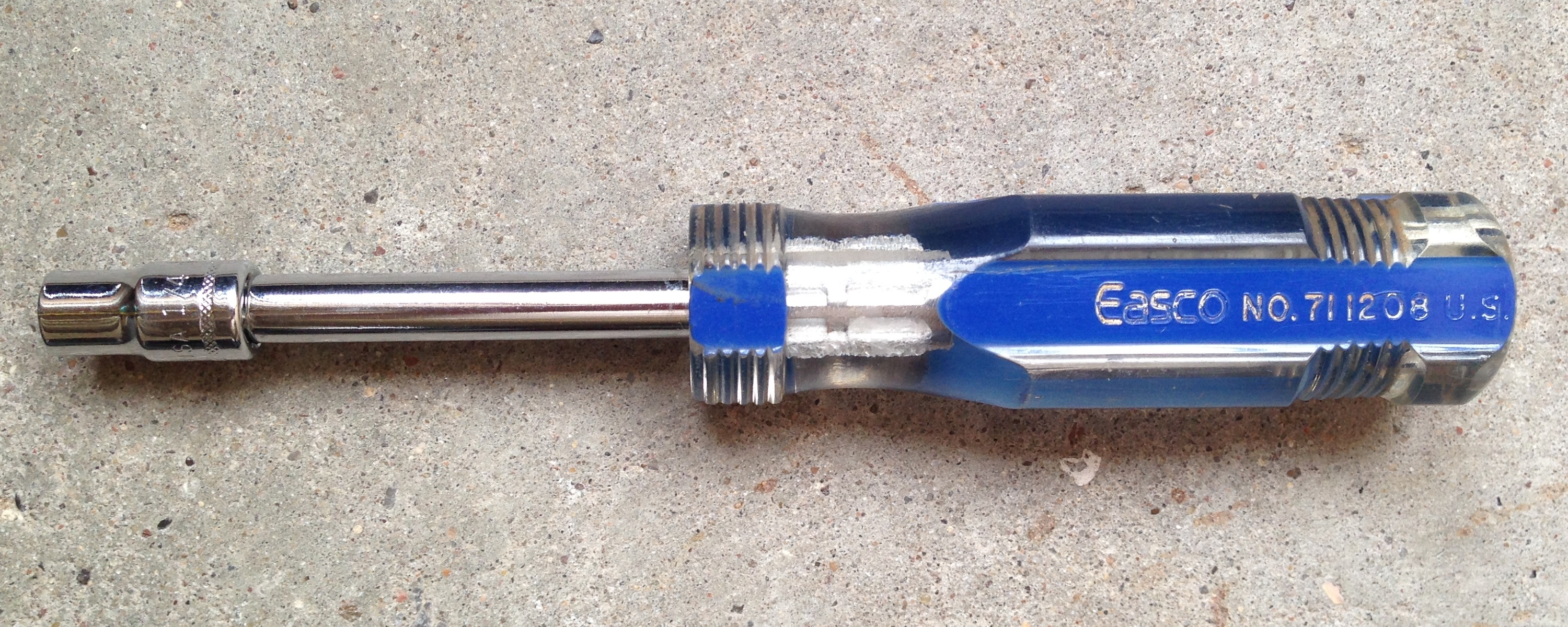
An Easco spinner handle with a detachable 1/4 in (6.35 mm) socket attached.

A nutdriver or nut driver is a hand tool for tightening or loosening nuts and bolts. It essentially consists of a socket attached to a shaft and cylindrical handle and is similar in appearance and use to a screwdriver. They generally have a hollow shaft to accommodate a shank onto which a nut is threaded. They are typically used for lower torque applications than wrenches or ratchets and are frequently used in the appliance repair and electronics industries.

Variations include T-shaped handles for providing the operator with a better grip, ratcheting handles, sockets with recessed magnets for holding fasteners, and flex shafts for bending around obstructions.

Indexable bits with the same purpose, to be held either in indexable handles or in power tool chucks, are called nutsetters.

A spinner handle is a shaft and handle with a drive fitting—most commonly 1/4 in (6.35 mm) square axle at the end for attaching interchangeable sockets. This allows one to use a single handle with a number of sizes instead of having a separate nut driver for each size. However, a spinner lacks the benefit of a hollow shaft; thus, a common alternative system is a single handle with interchangeable shafts in each size.

== See also ==
- Can wrench
- List of tools and equipment
- Socket wrench
