= Lufkin (brand) =

Measuring devices marketed by Apex Tools

- Product type: Tape measure
- Current owner: Apex Tool Group (2010)
- Country: United States
- Introduced: 1869
- Previous owners: Cooper Industries (1967)
- Website: lufkintool.com

Lufkin is a brand featuring primarily measurement tools such as calipers, gauges, micrometers, and measuring tapes. Lufkin is a brand of Apex Tool Group.

== History ==
Early Lufkin logo

The company was founded by Edward Taylor Lufkin, an American Civil War veteran of the Sixtieth Regiment Ohio Volunteer Infantry in Cleveland, Ohio, 1869 and was originally named E.T. Lufkin Board and Log Rule Manufacturing Company. Its Canadian manufacturing plant was first at Windsor, Ontario around 1907 and later at Barrie, Ontario around 1948. The company's headquarters and chief U.S. manufacturing plant later moved to Saginaw, Michigan, and remained there for decades.

The company was acquired in 1967 by Cooper Industries, which aimed to create a stable of hand tools brands through acquisitions. The Saginaw plant was soon closed and a new plant in Apex, North Carolina became the chief U.S. manufacturing plant.

The brand was a member of the Cooper Tools group until that group was sold off to form Apex Tool Group in 2012 and Cooper Industries was acquired by Eaton Corporation.

== Innovations ==
Throughout its history Lufkin patented a variety of devices and manufacturing processes.

- US 149321, Lufkin, Edward Taylor, "Improvement in Board Measures", issued April 7, 1874
- US 272279, Lufkin, Edward Taylor, "Headed Lumber Rule", issued February 13, 1883
- US 272892, Lufkin, Edward Taylor, "Machine for forming and dressing lumber-rules", issued February 27, 1883

== Gallery ==
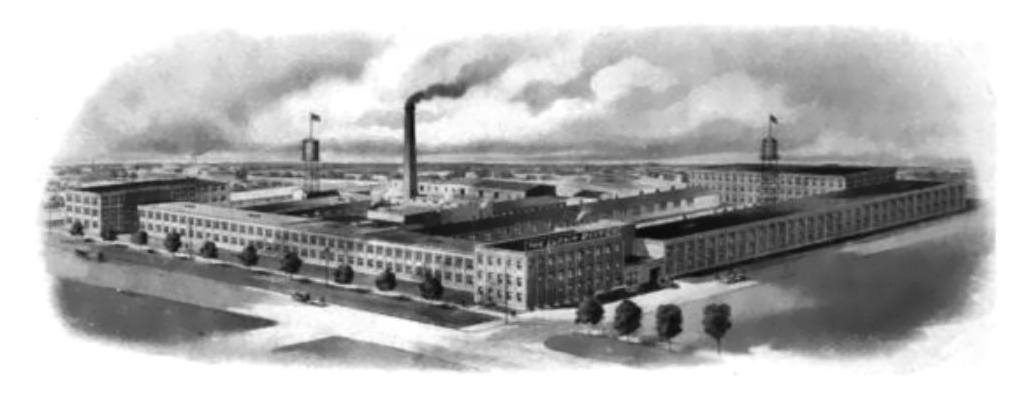
The Lufkin Rule Company plant in Saginaw, Michigan as it was c.1918

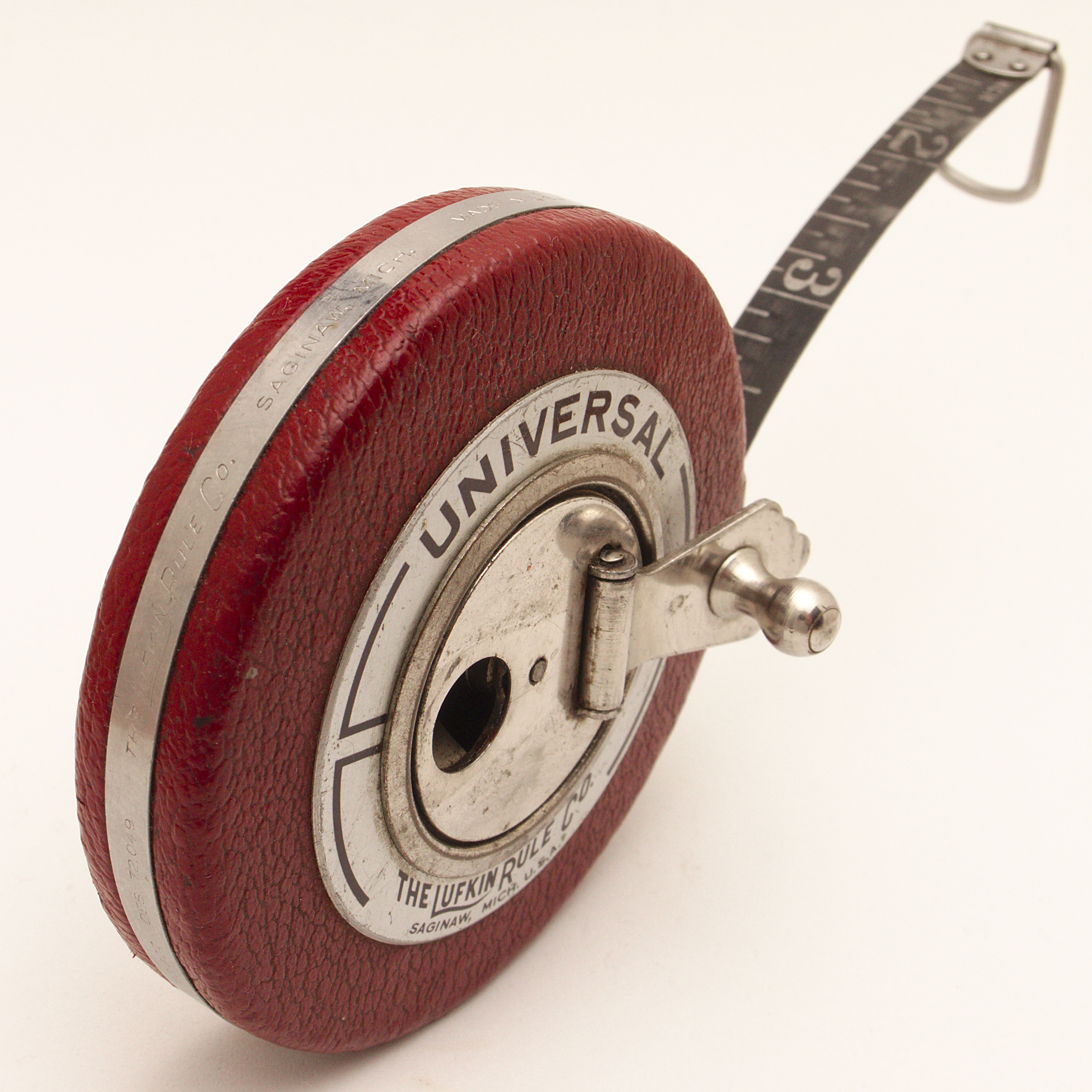
Lufkin tape measure

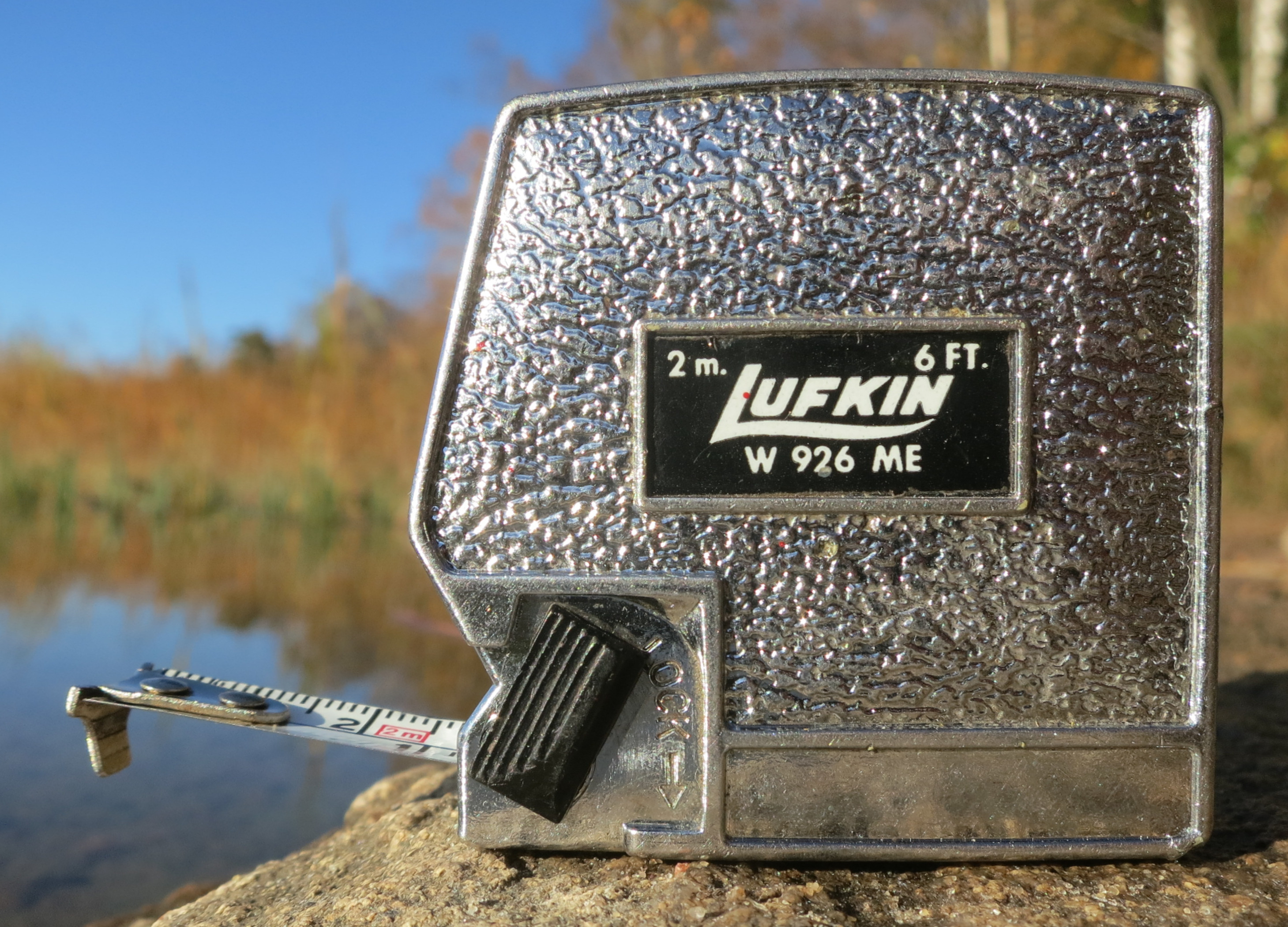
1960s retractable tape measure W926 by Lufkin
