= Apex Tool Group =

American supplier of hand tools and power tools

- Type: Limited Liability Company
- Industry: Manufacturing
- Founded: 2010; 16 years ago
- Headquarters: Sparks, Maryland, U.S.
- Products: Hand tools and power tools
- Revenue: $1.6B
- Owner: Bain Capital
- Number of employees: 8,000
- Website: www.apextoolgroup.com

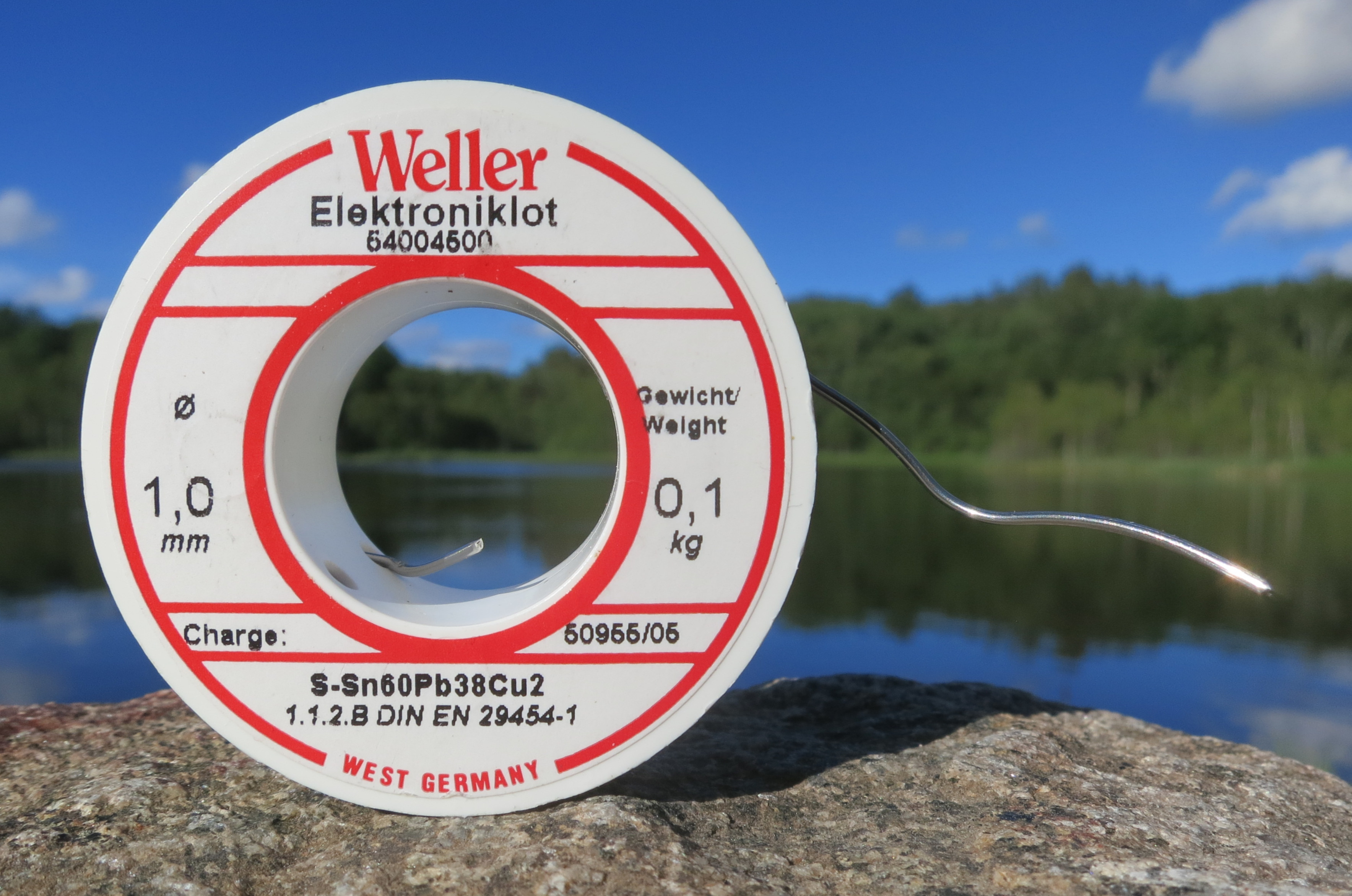
Electronics solder wire by Apex Tool Group's brand Weller.

Apex Tool Group is an American supplier of hand tools and power tools founded in 2010. It was formed as a joint venture of Cooper Industries and Danaher by the merger of Cooper Tools and Danaher's Tools and Components segment. In October 2012, Danaher and Cooper sold Apex to Bain Capital for about $1.6 billion. Apex is headquartered in Sparks, Maryland, and has over 20 factories globally including the United States, Canada, Mexico, Germany, China, and South America.

== Hand tool brands ==
- Allen (defunct) – Hex keys and hand tools
- Armstrong Tools (defunct) – Industrial hand tools
- Atkins – Hacksaws
- Belzer – Mechanic's hand tools
- Campbell – Manufactures chains and clamps. Winner of the "Member's Choice" award for Best New Program at the Do It Best Fall Market in Indianapolis for its chain accessories.
- Caulkmaster – Pneumatic dispensing guns.
- Collins – Machetes, shovels, and axes
- Crescent – Produces general hand tools and tool sets. Winner of Popular Mechanics' 2006 Breakthrough Award for its Rapid-Slide variant. Acquired by Cooper in 1968.
- Delta – tool boxes
- Erem – Precision pliers.
- GearWrench – Ratcheting wrenches and hand tools
- H.K. Porter – Bolt and cable cutters.
- Iseli – Precision matched parts
- Jacob's Chuck – drill chucks
- JOBOX – truck boxes and site storage
- K-D Tools – mechanic's hand and specialty tools
- K&F – files and rasps
- Kahnetics – Dispensing systems.
- Lufkin – Manufactures measuring tools such as calipers, gauges, micrometers, and measuring tapes. Lufkin was Cooper's first hand tool acquisition in 1967.
- Mayle – Mechanic's hand tools
- Nicholson – Produces files, rasps, and saws. Acquired by Cooper in 1972.
- Plumb – Striking tools, such as hammers, axes, and chisels. Acquired by Cooper in 1980.
- SATA – Mechanic's hand tools.
- Spline Gauges – gauges
- Weller – Soldering tools. Acquired by Cooper in 1970.
- Wire-wrap – Electrical connection equipment.
- Wiss – Scissors and snips. Acquired by Cooper in 1976.
- Xcelite – Electronics tools such as general and specialized screwdrivers and pliers. Acquired by Cooper in 1973.

Since 2018, Apex Tool Group has mainly focused on 3 major brands globally: Crescent, Gearwrench and SATA.

== Power tool brands ==
The Apex Tool Group Power Tool Division is headquartered in Lexington, South Carolina. It is made up of the following brands:

- Weller - soldering equipment
- Cleco – assembly tools
- Apex - Assembly & Fabrication Tools – production impact sockets, bits, and universal joints
- Xcelite
- Erem
