= ColorChecker =

Color calibration target

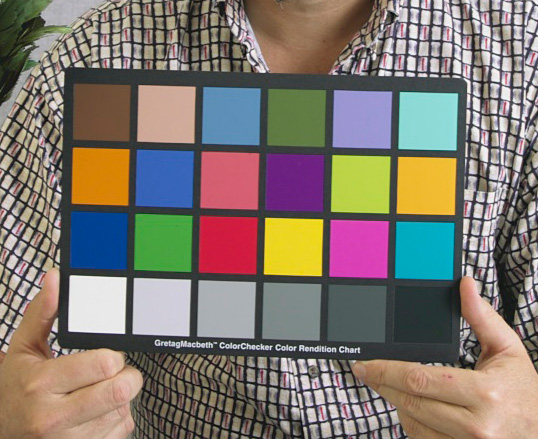
ColorChecker held in a photographic portrait setting

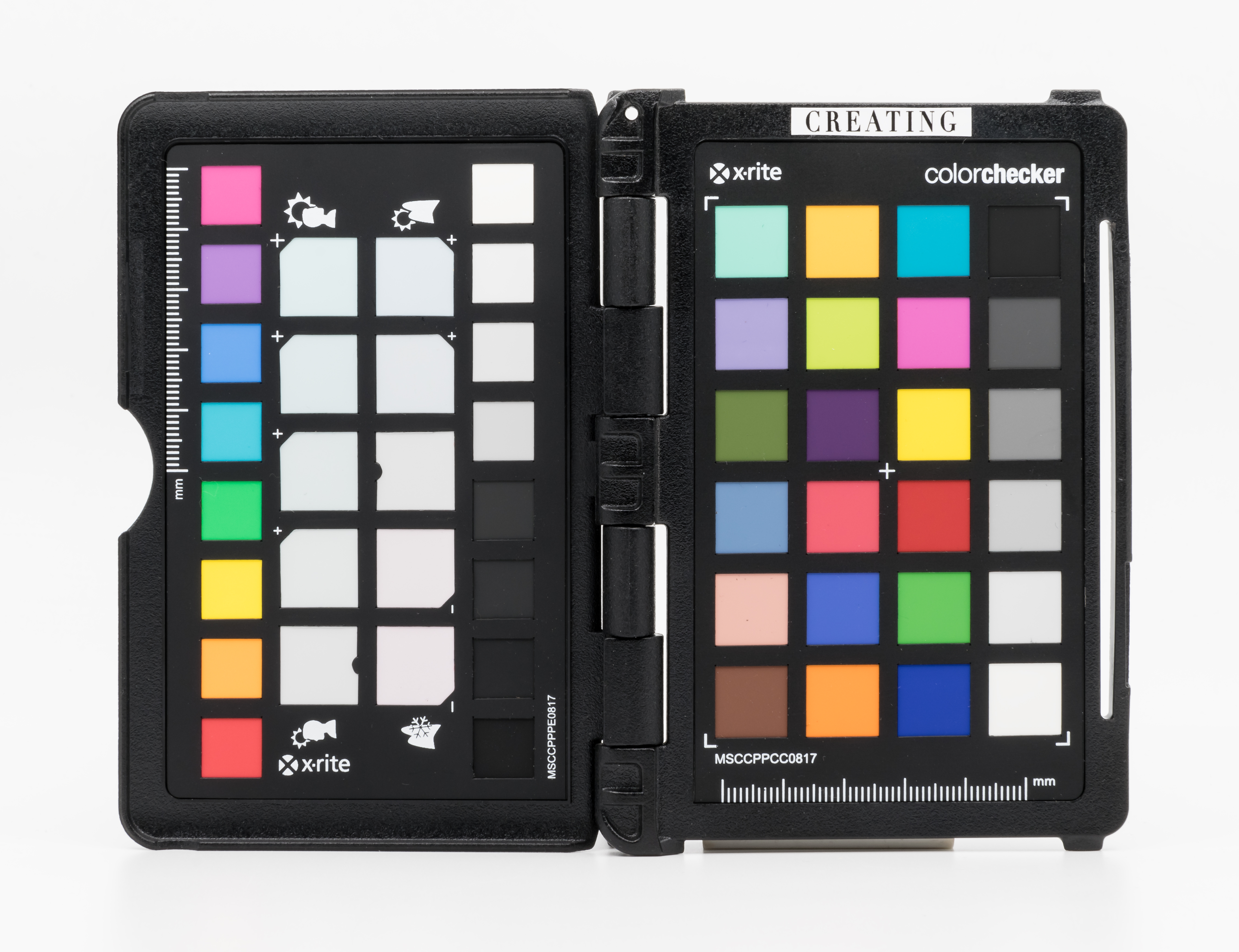
X-Rite ColorChecker Passport Photo 2

Nominal chromaticities of ColorChecker patches in the CIE 1931 xy chromaticity diagram (in the SVG version, hover over a color swatch to highlight it; click it to select and deselect it)

The ColorChecker Color Rendition Chart (often referred to by its original name, the Macbeth ColorChecker or simply Macbeth chart) is a color calibration target consisting of a cardboard-framed arrangement of 24 squares of painted samples. The ColorChecker was introduced in a 1976 paper by McCamy, Marcus, and Davidson in the Journal of Applied Photographic Engineering. The chart’s color patches have spectral reflectances intended to mimic those of natural objects such as human skin, foliage, and flowers, to have consistent color appearance under a variety of lighting conditions, especially as detected by typical color photographic film, and to be stable over time.

In 2006, Gretag-Macbeth was acquired by X-Rite. In 2021, X-Rite spun off its consumer-level calibration products to a separate company Calibrite, which is currently producing the ColorChecker under the Calibrite brand name.

== Design ==
The ColorChecker Classic chart is a rectangular card measuring about 11 by 8.25 inches (27.9 by 21.0 cm), or in its original incarnation about 13 by 9 inches (33 by 23 cm), an aspect ratio approximately the same as that of 35 mm film. It includes 24 patches in a 4 × 6 grid, each slightly under 2 inches (5.1 cm) square, made of matte paint applied to smooth paper, and surrounded by a black border. Six of the patches form a uniform gray lightness scale, and another six are primary colors typical of chemical photographic processes – red, green, blue, cyan, magenta, and yellow. The remaining colors include approximations of medium light and medium dark human skin, blue sky, the front of a typical leaf, and a blue chicory flower. The rest were chosen arbitrarily to represent a gamut "of general interest and utility for test purposes", though the orange and yellow patches are similarly colored to typical oranges and lemons.

There is also a ColorChecker Passport Photo 2, that includes a smaller version of the ColorChecker Classic with the same 24 chips but in a tri-fold version with some additional patches on two of the pages. Its dimensions are 125 mm (H) × 90 mm (W) × 9 mm (T). The pigments for ColorChecker Classic were modified in November 2014, so the current available cards do not have exactly the same carnation, and hence RGB numbers, as before, and particularly are not the ones provided on next section.

== Colors ==
PDF version of the chart

The colors of the chart were described by McCamy et al. with colorimetric measurements using the CIE 1931 2° standard observer and Illuminant C, and also in terms of the Munsell color system. Using measured reflectance spectra, it is possible to derive CIELAB coordinates for Illuminants D_{65} and D_{50} and coordinates in sRGB (D_{65}).

Table from Field (1990); CIE data for Illuminant C from Poynton (2008).
Index	Description	Munsell Notation	CIE xyY	Manufacturer's sRGB color values
Row 1: Natural colors
1	Dark skin	3 YR 3.7/3.2	0.400 0.350 10.1	#735244
2	Light skin	2.2 YR 6.47/4.1	0.377 0.345 35.8	#c29682
3	Blue sky	4.3 PB 4.95/5.5	0.247 0.251 19.3	#627a9d
4	Foliage	6.7 GY 4.2/4.1	0.337 0.422 13.3	#576c43
5	Blue flower	9.7 PB 5.47/6.7	0.265 0.240 24.3	#8580b1
6	Bluish green	2.5 BG 7/6	0.261 0.343 43.1	#67bdaa
Row 2: Miscellaneous colors
7	Orange	5 YR 6/11	0.506 0.407 30.1	#d67e2c
8	Purplish blue	7.5 PB 4/10.7	0.211 0.175 12.0	#505ba6
9	Moderate red	2.5 R 5/10	0.453 0.306 19.8	#c15a63
10	Purple	5 P 3/7	0.285 0.202 6.6	#5e3c6c
11	Yellow green	5 GY 7.1/9.1	0.380 0.489 44.3	#9dbc40
12	Orange yellow	10 YR 7/10.5	0.473 0.438 43.1	#e0a32e
Row 3: Primary and secondary colors
13	Blue	7.5 PB 2.9/12.7	0.187 0.129 6.1	#383d96
14	Green	0.25 G 5.4/9.6	0.305 0.478 23.4	#469449
15	Red	5 R 4/12	0.539 0.313 12.0	#af363c
16	Yellow	5 Y 8/11.1	0.448 0.470 59.1	#e7c71f
17	Magenta	2.5 RP 5/12	0.364 0.233 19.8	#bb5695
18	Cyan	5 B 5/8	0.196 0.252 19.8	#0885a1
Row 4: Grayscale colors
19	White	N 9.5/	0.310 0.316 90.0	#f3f3f3
20	Neutral 8	N 8/	0.310 0.316 59.1	#c8c8c8
21	Neutral 6.5	N 6.5/	0.310 0.316 36.2	#a0a0a0
22	Neutral 5	N 5/	0.310 0.316 19.8	#7a7a7a
23	Neutral 3.5	N 3.5/	0.310 0.316 9.0	#555555
24	Black	N 2/	0.310 0.316 3.1	#343434

== Use ==
Color targets such as the ColorChecker can be captured by cameras and other color input devices, and the resulting images’ output can be compared to the original chart, or to reference measurements, to test the degree to which image acquisition reproduction systems and processes approximate the human visual systems. It can also be used to color correct one photo with the chart in it (that may have a different color cast, for example due to a lighting coloration difference) to another "reference" photo with the chart in it.

Because of its wide availability and use, its careful design, and its consistency, and because comprehensive spectrophotometric measurements are available, the ColorChecker has also been used in academic research into topics such as spectral imaging.

== ColorChecker Digital SG ==
Calibrite also sells a 140-patch chart called the ColorChecker Digital SG, and is intended for automated use with computer software to characterize digital cameras and scanners.

== See also ==
- List of colors
- Color chart
- Color calibration
- Color management
- Color mapping
- ICC profile
- IT8
