= Qualitrol =

American technology company

Qualitrol LLC
- Type: Subsidiary of Fortive
- Traded as: NYSE: FTV; S&P 500 Component
- Industry: Condition monitoring; electric industry; oil and gas industry
- Founded: 1945
- Headquarters: Fairport, New York, U.S.
- Area served: Worldwide
- Key people: Bala Vinayagam (President)
- Products: List of products: Temperature Measurement Devices; Pressure Controls, Gauges, and Relays; Transformer Monitors; Liquid Level; Flow; Gas; Breaker Monitors, SF_{6} Controls and Gauges; Fault Recording and Fault Location; Power Quality Monitoring; Sequential Events Recording and Alarm Annunciation; Multifunction Software; Partial Discharge; Cable Monitoring
- Parent: Ralliant
- Subsidiaries: Iris Power; Neoptix; Serveron
- Website: www.qualitrolcorp.com

Qualitrol is a condition monitoring technology company headquartered in Fairport, New York. Qualitrol manufacturers and distributes partial discharge monitoring, asset protection equipment and information products for the electrical generation, transmission and distribution industries.

Qualitrol is a subsidiary of the Ralliant industrial conglomerate.

== History ==
In 1945, George Ford founded Qualitrol Corporation in Fairport, New York, to provide the electric utility industry with protective devices and monitoring systems. Ford opened a branch of Qualitrol in Waynesboro, Tennessee to manufacture valves. Later, Ford bought Microcontrol in St. Louis, Missouri, a manufacturer of thermostats, and the Dynapar Corporation in Gurney, Illinois a manufacturer of digital controls.

In 1986, Danaher Corporation acquired Qualitrol, establishing Qualitrol LLC. Qualitrol became part of Danaher's instrumentation unit, which included Gilbarco Veeder-Root's underground fuel storage sensors, Dynapar's motion sensors, and Qualitrol's pressure and temperature measurement instruments used on the electrical transformer industry. Danaher spun off several subsidiaries, including Qualitrol, in 2016 to create Fortive.

Qualitrol became part of Fortive in July, 2016.

== Corporate affairs ==
At the end of 2007, Qualitrol started to collaborate with Quebec City-based Neoptix Inc., a manufacturer of fiber optic temperature sensors. Initially, Qualitrol and Neoptix worked together on the integration of data collected simultaneously from traditional methods of temperature measurement and from optical direct hot-spot sensors. Subsequently, Neoptix became a sole subsidiary of Qualitrol.

In 2010, Qualitrol acquired Mississauga, Ontario-based Iris Power, a supplier of on-line partial discharge testing of stator winding insulation in large motors and generators, from subsidiaries of Koch Chemical Technology Group, LLC, a Wichita-based multinational. Qualitrol thereby acquired a fleet of portable and continuous instruments and monitoring systems that are integrated into a power plant's Distributed Control System (DCS) or a Supervisory Control and Data Acquisition (SCADA) system.

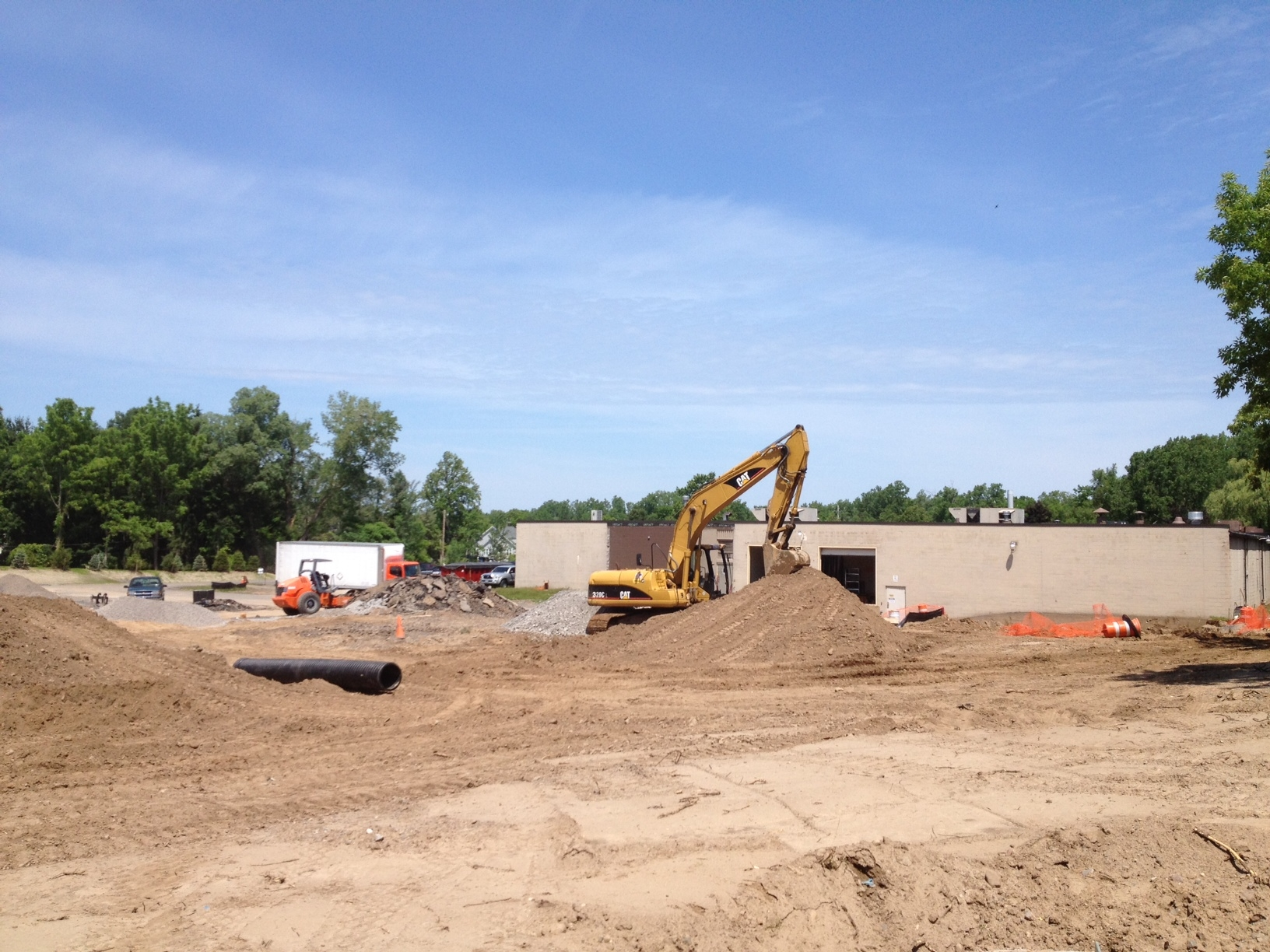
Qualitrol HQ Expansion 2012 Phase 1

At the end of 2011, Qualitrol began the expansion of its current production facility in Fairport, New York to 30,000 square feet (2,800 m^{2}).

=== Subsidiaries ===
- Qualitrol
  - Iris Power LP
  - Neoptix Fiber Optics LP
  - BPL Global (Serveron)

=== Divisions ===
- Asset Protection
- Transmission and Distribution
- Condition monitoring for Transmission and Distribution
- Condition monitoring for Generation
- Services

== Products ==
=== Asset protection ===
- Temperature Measurement Devices
- Pressure Controls, Gauges, and Relays
- Transformer Monitors
- Liquid Level
- Flow
- Gas
- Breaker Monitors, SF_{6} Controls and Gauges

=== Transmission and distribution ===
- Fault Recording and Fault Location
- Power Quality Monitoring
- Sequential Events Recording and Alarm Annunciation
- Multifunction Software

=== Condition monitoring ===
- Transformer Monitors
- Breaker Monitors, SF_{6} Controls and Gauges
- Partial Discharge
- Cable Monitoring

== Global operations ==
Qualitrol also has manufacturing facilities in Belfast, and Mississauga. The Belfast facility focuses on Qualitrol instruments and the Glasgow facility is now defunct and dissolved, merged with Belfast. The Quebec City unit operates as Neoptix and the Mississauga unit operates under Iris Power. Though each location specializes, projects are worked on by teams in multiple locations.

Qualitrol adheres to the standards of international organizations, including the Institute of Electrical and Electronics Engineers Standards Association (IEEE-SA) and the International Council on Large Electric Systems (CIGRE).

=== Offices ===
- Fairport - Qualitrol Headquarters
- Belfast - Qualitrol Instruments Hathaway
- east kilbride - Qualitrol DMS (discontinued)

- Mississauga - Iris Power
- Quebec City - Neoptix (closed)
- Beaverton, Oregon - Serveron

- Ahmedabad - IDC
