= Hengstler =

Hengstler Can refer to the following:

== People ==
- Friedrich Hengstler (1913–1998), Oberleutnant in the Wehrmacht

== Organizations ==
- Hengstler GmbH, a manufacturing company owned by Fortive, Inc.
