= Slave station =

Slave station may refer to:

- A collection and transfer location utilized in the slave trade
- A station having a clock synchronized by a remote master station in a navigation system
- In a data network a station that is selected and controlled by a master station
