= ThinkPad W700 =

Lenovo ThinkPad W700 series
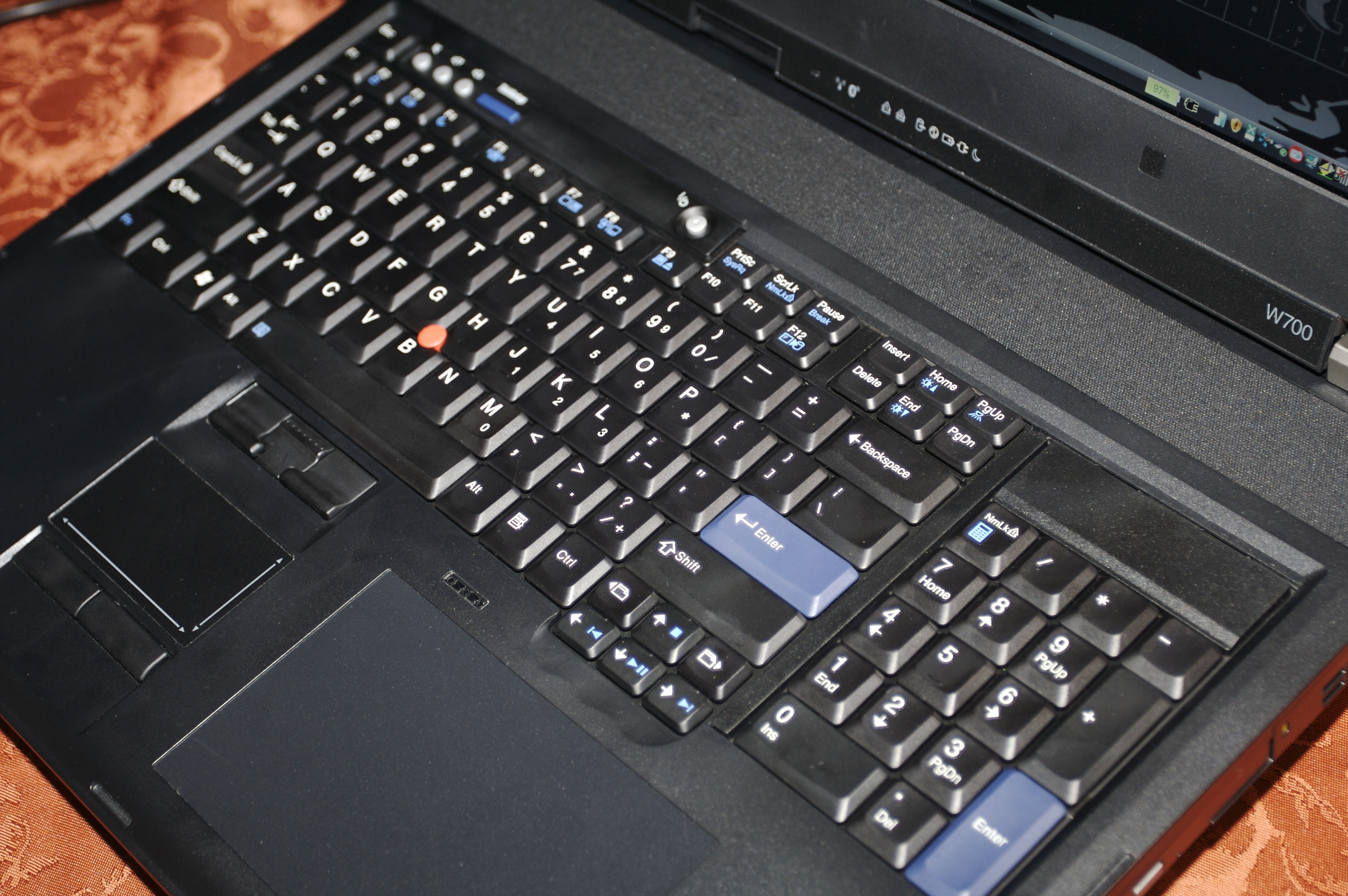
- Released: 2008

The Lenovo ThinkPad W700 is a laptop that was manufactured by Lenovo.

== Reception ==
LaptopMag gave it 4/5 stars and noted its good 3D performance, built-in Wacom digitizer and good display with color calibration. Christopher Null from Wired magazine gave it a 7/10.

== Successor ==
The W701ds was released in February 2010, after specifications were leaked earlier that month. The W701ds had an introduction price of 3799 USD. At the time of the release, Lenovo stated that according to their market research, customers did not want devices with a slate form factor.
