= Pantone =

American company known for its color system

Pantone LLC
- Type: Subsidiary
- Industry: Design services
- Founded: 1962; 64 years ago in Carlstadt, New Jersey
- Founder: Lawrence Herbert
- Headquarters: Carlstadt, New Jersey, United States
- Products: Pantone Color Matching System
- Parent: X-Rite (Veralto)
- Website: www.pantone.com

Pantone LLC (stylized as PANTONE) is an American limited liability company headquartered in Carlstadt, New Jersey, and best known for its Pantone Matching System (PMS), a proprietary color naming system used in a variety of industries, notably graphic design, fashion design, product design, textile industry, printing, as well as manufacturing and supporting the management of color from design to production, in physical and digital formats, across coated paper and uncoated paper stocks, as well as cotton, polyester, nylon and plastics.

The company is a subsidiary of X-Rite, which is a subsidiary of Veralto.

== History ==
Pantone began in New Jersey in the 1950s as the commercial printing company of brothers Mervin and Jesse Levine, M & J Levine Advertising. In 1956, its founders, both advertising executives, hired recent Hofstra University graduate Lawrence Herbert as a color matching specialist after passing their color sorting test. Herbert used his chemistry knowledge to systematize and simplify the company's stock of pigments and production of colored inks. By 1962, Herbert was running the ink and printing division at a profit, while the commercial-display division was US$50,000 in debt; he subsequently purchased the company's technological assets from the Levine Brothers for US$50,000 (equivalent to $530,000 in 2025).

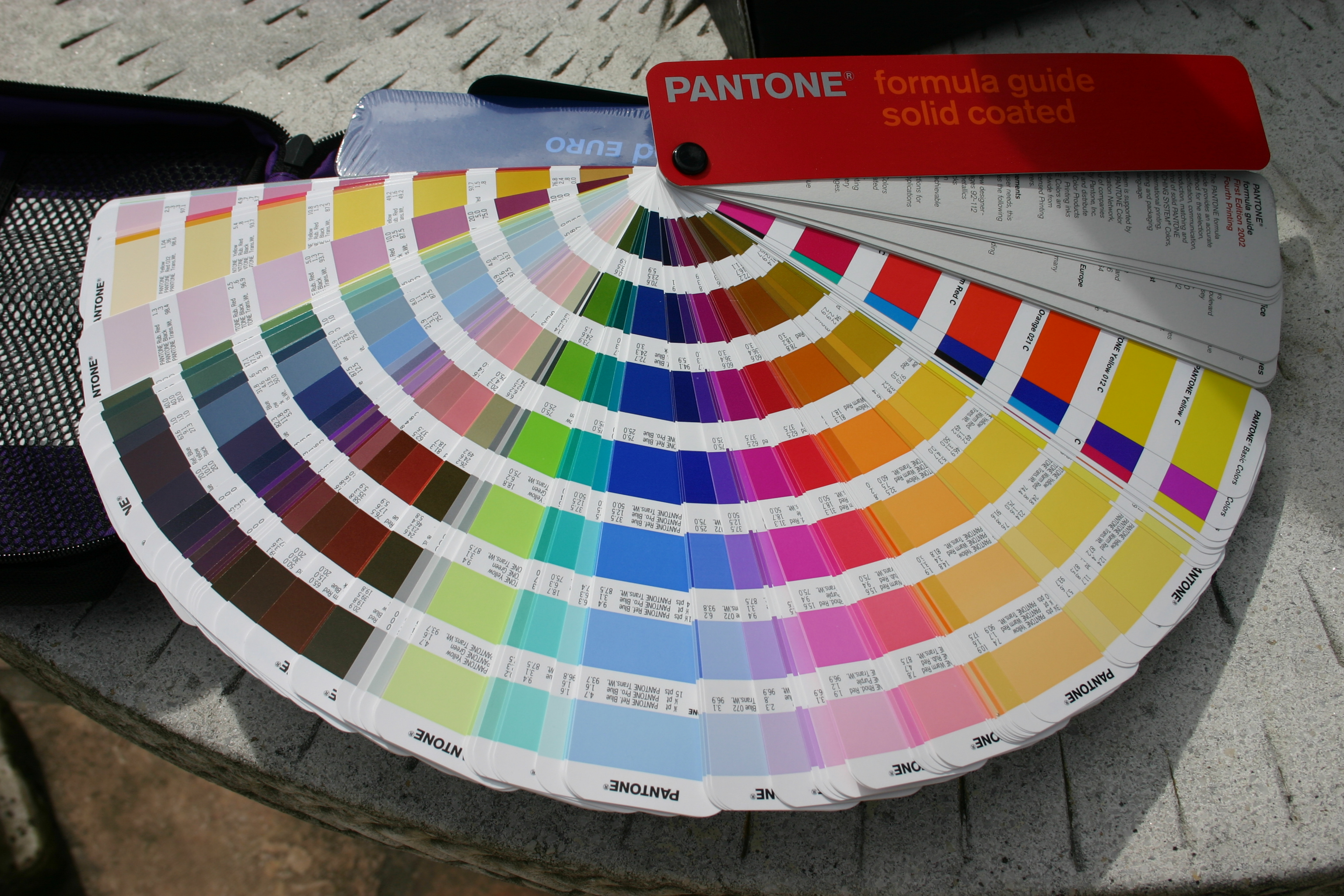
Pantone formula guide

The company's primary products include the Pantone Guides, which consist of a large number of small (approximately 6×2 inches or 15×5 cm) thin cardboard or plastic sheets, printed on one side with a series of related color swatches and then bound into a small "fan deck". For instance, a particular "page" might contain several yellows of varying tints.

The idea behind the PMS is to allow designers to "color match" specific colors when a design enters production stage, regardless of the equipment used to produce the color. This system has been widely adopted by graphic designers and reproduction and printing houses. Pantone recommends that PMS Color Guides be purchased annually, as their inks become yellowish over time. Color variance also occurs within editions based on the paper stock used (coated, matte or uncoated), while interedition color variance occurs when there are changes to the specific paper stock used.

X-Rite, a supplier of color measurement instruments and software, purchased Pantone for US$180 million in October 2007. X-Rite was acquired by Danaher Corporation in 2012. In September 2023, Danaher completed the corporate spin-off of its Environmental and Applied Solutions segment (which included Pantone) as Veralto.

=== Adobe dispute ===
In 2022, a dispute between Pantone and Adobe resulted in the removal of Pantone color coordinates from Photoshop and Adobe's other design software, causing colors in graphic artists' digital documents to be replaced with black unless artists paid Pantone a separate $15 monthly subscription fee. Artists accused Pantone and Adobe of holding their work hostage.

== Pantone Color Matching System ==
Spectra of Pantone Colors

from Yellow to Orange

from Orange to Red

The Pantone Color Matching System is largely a standardized color reproduction system; as of 2019 it has 2161 colors. By standardizing the colors, different manufacturers in different locations can all refer to the Pantone system to make sure colors match without direct contact with one another.

One such use is standardizing colors in the CMYK process. The CMYK process is a method of printing color by using four inks—cyan, magenta, yellow, and black. A majority of the world's printed material is produced using the CMYK process, and there is a special subset of Pantone colors that can be reproduced using CMYK. Those that are possible to simulate through the CMYK process are labeled as such within the company's guides.

However, about 30% of the Pantone system's 1114 spot colors (as of year 2000) cannot be simulated with CMYK but with 13 base pigments (14 including black) mixed in specified amounts, called base colors. Those 1114 colors included 387 colors with numbers 100 to 487 from 1975 and some lighter colors from 600 to 732 in 1991. The original four-digit colors introduced in 1987 were remapped into three digits.

The Pantone system also later allowed for many special colors to be produced, such as metallics, fluorescents (neons) and pastels. There are 56 fluorescents from 801 to 814 (first 7 here are base colors, so called Dayglo) and from 901 to 942. Packaging metallics (previously premium metallics) are placed from 10101 to 10454 (54 of those added later, 354 altogether, 2 base colors Silver 10077 and Rose Gold 10412), while normal metallics are placed from 871 to 877 (first 7 here are base colors) and from 8001 to 8965. Pastels are from 9140 to 9163 with base colors being 0131, 0331, 0521, 0631, 0821, 0921 and 0961. While most of the Pantone system colors are beyond the printed CMYK gamut, it was only in 2001 that Pantone began providing translations of their existing system with screen-based colors. Screen-based colors use the RGB color model—red, green, blue—system to create various colors. A lot of colors are outside sRGB. The (discontinued) Goe system has RGB, LAB, SPD values with each color and has 10 base colors while only 4 of those new: Bright Red, Pink, Medium Purple and Dark Blue. Other 6 were in the system before: Yellow 012, Orange 021, Rubine Red, Green, Process Blue and Black that in Goe were named Medium Yellow, Bright Orange, Strong Red, Bright Green, Medium Blue and Neutral Black. (PMS has 8 more basic base colors, some not monopigmented: Yellow 010, Red 032, Warm Red, Rhodamine Red, Purple, Violet, Reflex Blue, Blue 072.)

Pantone colors are described by their allocated number (typically referred to as, for example, "PMS 130"). PMS colors are almost always used in branding and have even found their way into government legislation and military standards (to describe the colors of flags and seals). In January 2003, the Scottish Parliament debated a petition (reference PE512) to refer to the blue in the Scottish flag as "Pantone 300". Countries such as Canada and South Korea and organizations such as the FIA have also chosen to refer to specific Pantone colors to use when producing flags. US states including Texas have set legislated PMS colors of their flags.

== Pantone Goe System ==
On September 5, 2007, Pantone introduced the Goe System. Goe consisted of 2058 new colors in a new matching and numbering system. In addition to the standard swatch books (now called the GoeGuide), the new system also included adhesive-backed GoeSticks, interactive software, tools, and an online community where users were able to share color swatches and information.

The Goe system was streamlined to use fewer base colors (ten, plus clear coating for reflections, only 4 base colors were new) and accommodate many technical challenges in reproducing colors on a press.

The Pantone Goe system was discontinued in November 2013, but four new base colors were added into PMS and some of new colors too, though those four base colors are harder to purchase.

== Other products ==
In mid-2006 Pantone, partnering with Vermont-based Fine Paints of Europe, introduced a new line of interior and exterior paints. The color palette uses Pantone's color research and trending and has more than 3,000 colors.

In November 2015, Pantone partnered with Redland London to create a collection of bags inspired from Pantone's authority on color.

Pantone also produced Hexachrome, a patented six-color printing system. In addition to custom CMYK inks, Hexachrome added orange and green inks to expand the color gamut, for better color reproduction. It was therefore also known as a CMYKOG process. Hexachrome was discontinued by Pantone in 2008 when Adobe Systems stopped supporting their HexWare plugin software. In 2015 a 7-color printing system was developed, adding Violet in CMYKOGV, that can cover 90% of 1114 spot colors, while CMYK only about 60%. 1729 new colors were added, marked XGC (extended gamut coated), some colors do not have a number, like Process Blue XGC or Purple XGC. Base colors of OGV were new mono-pigment inks, pigments PO34, PG7 and PV23 were used respectively with 58°, 180° and 311° hue angles.

Pantone Color Manager allows for users of the Adobe Creative Suite and Creative Cloud as well as other software to import the most up to date information inclusive of L*a*b* numbers as well as CMYK and sRGB representations of all the various palettes (including chromatic adaptation under default D50 or D65 with 2 degree or 10 degree observer or even any ICC profile). L*a*b* numbers allow for the most accurate representation of color in a device-independent manner, but ideally X-rite InkFormulation is needed to emulate substrates and all 14 base colors of main Pantone system or 7 colors of CMYKOGV. Support is being phased out in favour of Pantone Connect plugin from Adobe Exchange of Creative Cloud. Adobe Illustrator removed five acb files (Adobe Color Books) of Pantone+ colors in 2023 when Pantone+ was deprecated by Pantone.

== Color of the Year ==
Since 2000, the Pantone Color Institute has declared a particular color "Color of the Year". Twice a year the company hosts, in a European capital, a secret meeting of representatives from various nations' color standards groups. After two days of presentations and debate, they choose a color for the following year; for example, the color for summer 2013 was chosen in London in the spring of 2012.

The selected color purportedly connects with the zeitgeist; for example, the press release declaring Honeysuckle the color of 2011 said "In times of stress, we need something to lift our spirits. Honeysuckle is a captivating, stimulating color that gets the adrenaline going – perfect to ward off the blues." The results of the meeting are published in Pantone View, which fashion designers, florists, and many other consumer-oriented companies purchase to help guide their designs and planning for future products. In 2016 and 2021, Pantone chose two colors for Color of the Year.

2000
Cerulean
Pantone 15-4020
#9BB7D4

2001
Fuchsia Rose
Pantone 17-2031
#C74375

2002
True Red
Pantone 19-1664
#BF1932

2003
Aqua Sky
Pantone 14-4811
#7BC4C4

2004
Tigerlily
Pantone 17-1456
#E2583E

2005
Blue Turquoise
Pantone 15-5217
#53B0AE

2006
Sand Dollar
Pantone 13-1106
#DECDBE

2007
Chili Pepper
Pantone 19-1557
#9B1B30

2008
Blue Iris
Pantone 18-3943
#5A5B9F

2009
Mimosa
Pantone 14-0848
#F0C05A

2010
Turquoise
Pantone 15-5519
#45B5AA

2011
Honeysuckle
Pantone 18-2120
#D94F70

2012
Tangerine Tango
Pantone 17-1463
#DD4124

2013
Emerald
Pantone 17-5641
#009473

2014
Radiant Orchid
Pantone 18-3224
#B163A3

2015
Marsala
Pantone 18-1438
#955251

2016
Rose Quartz
Pantone 13-1520
#F7CAC9

2016
Serenity
Pantone 15-3919
#92A8D1

2017
Greenery
Pantone 15-0343
#88B04B

2018
Ultra Violet
Pantone 18-3838
#5F4B8B

2019
Living Coral
Pantone 16-1546
#FF6F61

2020
Classic Blue
Pantone 19-4052
#0F4C81

2021
Ultimate Gray
Pantone 17-5104
#939597

2021
Illuminating
Pantone 13-0647
#F5DF4D

2022
Very Peri
Pantone 17-3938
#6667AB

2023
Viva Magenta
Pantone 18-1750
#BB2649

2024
Peach Fuzz
Pantone 13-1023
#FFBE98

2025
Mocha Mousse
Pantone 17-1230
#A47864

2026
Cloud Dancer
Pantone 11-4201
#F0EFEA

In 2012, the color of the year, Tangerine Tango, was used to create a makeup line, in partnership with Sephora. The product line, named Sephora + Pantone Universe collection, features Tangerine Tango–embellished false lashes, nail lacquers, cream, glitters, and high-pigment lip glosses. 2013 Emerald color was reported to be out of sRGB gamut. Also new Very Peri color of 2022 is present in TCX (dyed cotton reference) and TPG (Textile Paper – "Green") form, here TCX for sRGB hex values are mentioned.

The person behind Pantone's Color of the Year, executive director of the Pantone Color Institute Leatrice Eiseman, explained in an interview how 2014's Color of the Year, Radiant Orchid, was chosen:

I look for ascending color trends, colors that are being used in broader ways and broader context than before ... In this case, Radiant Orchid descends from the purple family, which is kind of a magical color that denotes creativity and innovation. Purple is just that kind of a complex, interesting, attracting kind of color ... [The] back-story to purple is that it inspires confidence in your creativity, and we're living in a world where that kind of creative innovation is greatly admired. In the world of color, purple is an attention-getter, and it has a meaning. It speaks to people, and we felt that it was time for the purple family to be celebrated. That's why we chose the particular shade called Radiant Orchid.

— L. Eiseman

Pantone has said that color "has always been an integral part of how a culture expresses the attitudes and emotions of the times."

== Intellectual property ==
Pantone asserts that their lists of color numbers and pigment values are the intellectual property of Pantone and free use of the list is not allowed. This is frequently held as a reason Pantone colors cannot be supported in open-source software and are not often found in low-cost proprietary software. Pantone has been accused of "being intentionally unclear" about its exact legal claims, but it is acknowledged that "the simplest claim would be trademark misappropriation or dilution towards someone who produced a color palette marketed as compatible with Pantone's".

By contrast, intellectual property scholar Aaron Perzanowski claims that Pantone has no intellectual property rights over individual colors or color libraries.

== See also ==
- Color chart – other color systems and charts
- CMYK color model
- Natural Color System (NCS), Munsell color system, and other proprietary color spaces where most consumers use swatches to make color decisions; unlike Pantone, these systems are based on underlying color models rather than pigment mixtures.
- RAL colour standard
- Spot color
