= Molecular Devices =

American bioanalysis corporation

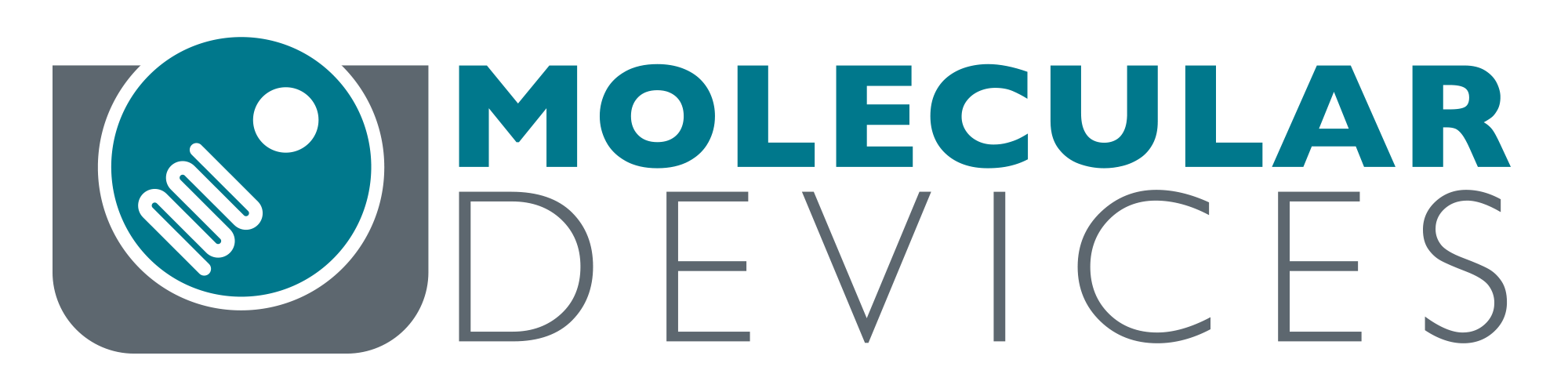
- Type: Subsidiary
- Industry: Bioanalysis
- Founded: 1983; 43 years ago
- Headquarters: San Jose, CA, United States
- Area served: Worldwide
- Owner: Danaher Corporation
- Number of employees: 815 (2023)
- Website: moleculardevices.com

Molecular Devices is an American company that supplies bioanalytical measurement devices and systems for drug discovery and other life sciences research. The company has been a subsidiary of Danaher Corporation since 2010.

== Company history ==
Founded in 1983, Molecular Devices introduced its first microplate reader in 1987 and since then has continually broadened its solution set through a combination of internal research and development efforts as well as strategic acquisitions. In 1996 Molecular Devices acquired the FLIPR technology from NovelTech Systems Inc. of Ann Arbor Michigan and in 2000 they licensed the IonWorks high-throughput electrophysiology system from Essen Bioscience also of Ann Arbor Michigan.

Molecular Devices then acquired Universal Imaging Corporation in 2002, Axon Instruments in 2004, and Blueshift Technologies in 2008, broadening its portfolio to include electrophysiology products, scanners and analysis software for microarrays, and workstations for cell-based screening using high-resolution imaging.

In March 2007, Molecular Devices was acquired by Canadian MDS, Inc. and became part of MDS Analytical Technologies. In 2010, MDS Inc. completed a strategic repositioning which saw the Company divest its MDS Analytical Technologies and MDS Pharma Services businesses. In February 2010, Danaher Corporation acquired MDS Analytical Technologies, and Molecular Devices, Inc. now operates within the Danaher Medical Technologies segment.

== Services ==
Molecular Devices supplies analytical systems, including instruments, software, and reagents, to accelerate and improve drug discovery and basic life science research.

Molecular Devices is based in Silicon Valley, CA, United States, and has regional offices in the United Kingdom, Germany, Austria, Korea, China, and Japan to support the global life sciences—drug discovery and basic research—communities.

== Products ==
- Microplate Readers
- Microscope imagers - the ImageXpress Micro series are widefield microscope imagers that capture crystal-clear images of complex cell models.
