= Integrated DNA Technologies =

American biotechnology company

Integrated DNA Technologies, Inc.
- Company type: Private
- Industry: Biotechnology
- Founded: Coralville, IA, USA 1987
- Founder: Dr. Joseph A. Walder
- Headquarters: Coralville, IA, U.S.
- Number of locations: Coralville, IA USA – San Diego, CA USA – Skokie, IL USA – Leuven, Belgium – Singapore
- Area served: Research and diagnostics life sciences market
- Products: Oligonucleotides
- Number of employees: 1,661 (2023)
- Parent: Danaher Corporation
- Website: IDTDNA.com

Integrated DNA Technologies, Inc. (IDT), headquartered in Coralville, Iowa, is a supplier of custom nucleic acids, serving the areas of academic research, biotechnology, clinical diagnostics, and pharmaceutical development. IDT's primary business is the manufacturing of custom DNA and RNA oligonucleotides (oligos) for research applications.

Joseph A. Walder, M.D., Ph.D. (Northwestern University), founded Integrated DNA Technologies, Inc. in 1987 through a partnership with Baxter Healthcare Corporation at the University of Iowa Technology Innovation Center business incubator. In its first 10 years, IDT grew from a startup with 10 synthesizing machines to a small company with more than 500, shipping an average 75,000 custom oligos per day to more than 82,000 customers worldwide. In March 2018, IDT was acquired by Danaher Corporation for a reported $1.9 billion.

== Mission ==
IDT's mission is to enable discovery in biology and medicine. The company strives to achieve this by improving nucleic acid synthesis technology and developing new applications for the use of DNA- and RNA-based compounds. IDT's advanced synthesis group combines expertise in chemistry, molecular biology, and engineering to produce and purify complex nucleic acids of all kinds.

== SciTools ==
Synthetic oligonucleotides are used in various molecular biology applications, e.g., polymerase chain reaction (PCR), molecular beacons, microarrays, mutagenesis, RNAi, antisense and gene synthesis. Published bioinformatics algorithms can predict biophysical properties of oligonucleotides from their sequence and estimate oligonucleotide performance in specific assays, when used singly or together with other sequences. IDT's SciTools is a free online suite of computational software tools that enable molecular biologists to design, evaluate and make informed decisions about the properties of nucleic acid sequences. Instructions and help to each software tool can be found at the top of web input forms. The code is regularly updated when more accurate models and algorithms are published.

== Major product areas ==
DNA & RNA Synthesis	Oligonucleotide Modifications
Functional Genomics	Genotyping
Next Generation Sequencing	Gene Expression
Reagents	Mutation Detection
GMP for Molecular Diagnostics	Large Scale Oligo Synthesis
RNase H-dependent PCR (rhPCR)

== Certifications ==
IDT earned its ISO 9001:2000 certification at its oligonucleotide production headquarters in 2005.

IDT earned its ISO 13485:2003 certification for its Quality Management System in 2008.
