= Leatrice Eiseman =

American color specialist

Leatrice Eiseman is an American color specialist, who assists companies in their color choice in a range of areas, including packaging, logos, and interior design. She is the executive director of the Pantone Color Institute, a division of Pantone, Inc., and the author of six books on color, one of which won an award from the Independent Publisher's Association.

== Background ==
Eiseman holds a degree in psychology from Antioch University, and a counseling certificate from UCLA. She has studied and taught in the fields of fashion and interior design. She is an allied member of the Industrial Designers Society of America and the Fashion Group International, and has received a service award from the Color Marketing Group. She selects the ten top fashion colors twice yearly for Pantone and Women's Wear Daily.

== Publications ==
- Colors for Your Every Mood (1998)
- Pantone Guide to Communicating with Color (2000)
- The Color Answer Book (2003)
- More Alive With Color (2006)
- Color: Messages and Meanings (2006)
- Pantone: The 20th Century in Color (2011)
- Pantone on Fashion: A Century of Color in Design (2014)
- The Complete Color Harmony: Pantone Edition (2017)
