= Danaher Corporation =

American healthcare company

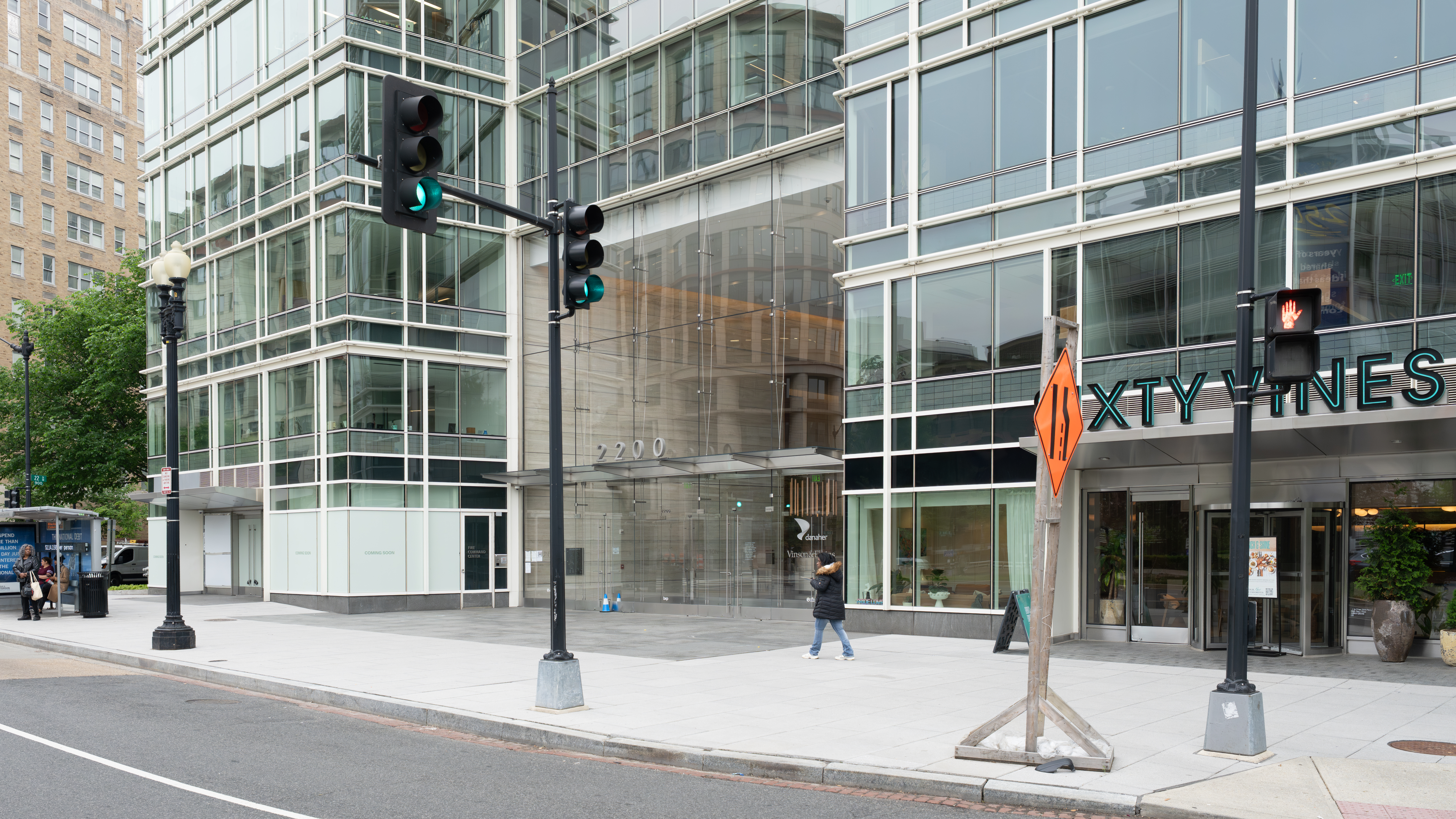
- Headquarters in Washington, D.C.
- Type: Public
- Traded as: NYSE: DHR; S&P 100 component; S&P 500 component
- Industry: Healthcare industry
- Founded: 1969; 57 years ago (as DMG); 1984; 42 years ago (as Danaher)
- Founders: Steven Rales; Mitchell Rales
- Headquarters: Washington, D.C., US
- Area served: Worldwide
- Key people: Steven Rales (chairman of the board); Mitchell Rales (chairman of the executive committee); Julie Sawyer Montgomery (president and CEO)
- Revenue: ▲US$24.6 billion (2025)
- Net income: ▼US$3.61 billion (2025)
- Number of employees: c. 63,000 (2024)
- Divisions: List of divisions
- Website: www.danaher.com

Danaher Corporation is an American healthcare company headquartered in Washington, D.C.. It develops products used for advances in biotechnology, life sciences, and diagnostics. The company operates three divisions: biotechnology (28% of 2024 revenues), which develops products for the development of therapeutics; life sciences (31% of 2024 revenues), which develops products to identify causes of disease, new therapies, and to test and manufacture new drugs, vaccines and gene editing technologies; and diagnostics (41% of 2024 revenues), which develops instruments, consumables, and software and services to diagnose diseases. Danaher was founded in 1984 by brothers Steven Rales and Mitchell Rales; it was named after Danaher Creek in Western Montana, where the brothers came up with the idea for the company while fishing.

The company is ranked 180th on the Fortune 500 and 241st on the Forbes Global 2000.

== History ==
Former logo

=== Early years ===
The company's origins go back to DMG, Inc., a Massachusetts real estate investment trust organized in 1969. In 1978, DMG, Inc. was reorganized as a Florida corporation and changed its name to Diversified Mortgage Investors, Inc. In 1983, the Stephen M. Rales and Mitchell P. Rales invested in the company, which at that time was invested in retirement home developments, they then replaced the existing management in a bitter proxy battle.

In 1984, the company adopted the name Danaher and reincorporated under the Delaware General Corporation Law. The name came from a river in Montana.

In 1985, the Rales brothers offered $400 million in a hostile bid for Scott Fetzer Company but lost out to Berkshire Hathaway.

In June 1986, Danaher acquired Chicago Pneumatic in a hostile takeover, offering $60.8 million for the 32% of the company not already owned. The company had merged in July 1984 with a sister company, the Jacobs Manufacturing Co., and had purchased Matco Tools in April 1981.

In June 1987, Danaher sold Chicago Pneumatic while retaining Jacobs, including its Matco Tools Division. Jacobs' name was changed to Matco Tools Corp. In November 1991, the other divisions within Jacobs were established as separate operating companies. In January 1993, Danaher formed NMTC, Inc., which acquired a substantial portion of the assets of MTC, including the existing distributorship agreements of MTC.

In 1986, Danaher added Qualitrol to its instrumentation unit, including Gilbarco Veeder-Root's underground fuel storage sensors, Dynapar's motion sensors, and pressure measurement and temperature measurement instruments used on the electrical transformer industry.

=== 1990–2000 ===
In 1990, Danaher acquired Easco Hand Tools Inc. Danaher was selected as exclusive supplier of hand tools for Sears. In 1994, Danaher acquired Armstrong Tools, the makers of tool brands Armstrong, Allen, and others.

In 1995, Danaher acquired Hengstler GmbH, a manufacturer of counters, printers, relays, and high-precision rotational sensors. Hengstler was Danaher's first acquisition headquartered outside the United States.

In 1999, the company acquired Hach Company, involved in water and wastewater—and analytics, for $325 million.

=== 2001–2010 ===
In 2000, H. Lawrence Culp Jr. was named CEO of Danaher; he had joined the company in 1990.

Danaher acquired Trojan Technologies, an environmental engineering firm, in 2004.

Danaher also acquired UK-based West Instruments, which provides control and measurement instrumentation and services for the global industrial and process markets.

Danaher announced its agreement to acquire the Gendex division from DENTSPLY International on December 11, 2003, with the acquisition closing in early 2004, integrating this dental imaging company into Danaher's growing dental portfolio.

PMA, a German manufacturer of control and measurement instrumentation, was acquired in April 2005.

In July 2005, Danaher acquired Leica Microsystems, which manufactures products for applications requiring microscopic imaging, measurement and analysis and offers management systems for biotechnology and medicine, as well as the science of raw materials and industrial quality assurance.

In early 2007, Danaher acquired Vision Systems, which manufactures and markets automated instruments, antibodies and biochemical reagents for biopsy-based detection of cancer and infectious diseases, for $520 million.

In July 2007, Danaher acquired ChemTreat.

In November 2007, Danaher purchased Tektronix for US$2.85 billion.

In 2009, Danaher acquired the Analytical Technologies business unit of MDS, including a 50% interest in AB SCIEX, for US$650 million. In February 2010, Danaher acquired the remaining 50% ownership position in AB SCIEX from Life Technologies for US$450 million.

=== 2011–2020 ===
In 2011, Danaher acquired Beckman Coulter, which was divided into a diagnostics segment and a life sciences segment.

In January 2012, Danaher sold Accu-sort to Datalogic.

In December 2012, Danaher acquired Navman Wireless, a provider of on-demand fleet and asset management technology.

In February 2013, Danaher and Cooper Industries sold their joint venture, Apex Tool Group, to Bain Capital for $1.6 billion.

In September 2014, Danaher acquired Nobel Biocare for $2.2 billion.

Effective March 1, 2015, H. Lawrence Culp Jr. resigned as CEO of Danaher.

In July 2015, Danaher combined its communications unit with NetScout Systems.

In August 2015, Danaher acquired Pall Corporation for $13.8 billion.

In June 2016, Danaher completed the corporate spin-off of Fortive, which included Matco and AMMCO-COATS. In September of the same year, the company announced it would acquire Cepheid for $4 billion including debt.

In October 2016, Danaher acquired Phenomenex for $700 million to expand in life sciences.

In October 2017, Danaher announced the acquisition of scientific informatics company ID Business Solutions Ltd. (IDBS). IDBS became part of Danaher's Life Sciences platform.

In March 2018, Danaher acquired Integrated DNA Technologies for an estimated $1.9 billion.

In July 2018, Danaher announced its intention to spin off its Dental segment into a public company, later named Envista Holdings Corporation. The corporate spin-off was completed in December 2019.

In March 2020, Integrated DNA Technologies, a subsidiary of the company, manufactured components for COVID-19 testing.

In March 2020, Danaher acquired the biopharma business of General Electric, a global provider of technologies and services related to the development, manufacture, and delivery of vaccines, diagnostics, and therapeutics to customers in organizations including academia, biotechnology, and drug manufacturing, for $21.4 billion and was rebranded as Cytiva. The GE deal raised monopoly concerns. The Federal Trade Commission conditionally approved the deal on the grounds that Danaher sold some biotechnology assets. In a second deal, Danaher's biomolecular characterization, chromatography hardware and resins, microcarriers and particle validation standards businesses were sold to Sartorius AG for approximately $825 million. The Cytiva name is derived from 'cyto' meaning 'cell' in Greek, and 'iva' a Latin suffix meaning 'doing' and 'capable of'.

Effective September 2020, Tom Joyce retired as CEO of the company; he was replaced by Executive Vice President Rainer Blair.

=== 2021–present ===
In June 2021, Precision Nanosystems was acquired by Cytiva.

In August 2021, Danaher acquired Aldevron, which produces mRNA and proteins used in mRNA vaccines, for $9.6 billion in cash.

In May 2023, Pall Corporation merged with Cytiva to create a new Biotechnology Group within Danaher; at that time Cytiva employed more than 16,000 associates in over 40 countries.

Also in September 2022, Danaher announced its intention to spin off its Environmental & Applied Solutions segment; in February 2023, it was named Veralto and the corporate spin-off was completed in September 2023. The division included Aquatic Informatics, ChemTreat, Esko, Hach Company, Linx, McCrometer, OTT HydroMet, Pantone, Sea-Bird Scientific, Trojan Technologies, Videojet, XOS, and X-Rite.

In December 2023, Danaher acquired Abcam for approximately $5.7 billion.

In June 2024, the Food and Drug Administration granted marketing approval to Danaher's Cepheid unit for a rapid test for hepatitis C. Using a blood sample from a fingertip, the rapid test detects the virus's RNA and delivers results in less than roughly an hour, as opposed to requiring a sample to be sent to a lab.

In August 2024, the company acquired GeneData. In February 2026, Danaher announced it would acquire Masimo for $10 billion.

== Divisions ==
=== Life sciences ===
- Abcam
- Beckman Coulter - Life Sciences
- Cytiva
- Integrated DNA Technologies
- Leica Microsystems
- Molecular Devices
- Pall Corporation
- SCIEX

=== Diagnostics ===
- Beckman Coulter - Diagnostics
- Cepheid
- Leica Biosystems
- Radiometer
