= Esko (company) =

Graphic arts company

Esko-Graphics BV
- Company type: Subsidiary
- Industry: Graphic arts
- Founded: 2002; 24 years ago
- Headquarters: Ghent, Belgium
- Key people: Joel Depernet
- Number of employees: 1,800 (2018)
- Parent: Veralto
- Website: www.esko.com

Esko-Graphics BV (Esko) is a graphic arts company that produces prepress computer software and computer hardware for the packaging and labels, sign and display and publishing industries. Esko is headquartered in Ghent, Belgium and is a subsidiary of Veralto.

== History ==
Esko was formed in 2001 through the merger of Barco Graphics and Purup-Eskofot A/S.

In the fall of 2005, Esko was acquired by Axcel, a Danish private equity firm.

In August 2007, Esko merged with Artwork Systems Group NV, its chief competitor in the packaging prepress market. Esko initially bought 76.69% of AWS shares for €196 million. Enfocus, a brand of PDF pre-flighting and workflow software acquired by Artwork Systems in 2000, became a subsidiary of the company.

In January 2011, the company was acquired by Danaher Corporation for €350 million or $470 million.

Esko acquired CAPE Systems, a palletization software vendor, in 2013.

It acquired MediaBeacon, a digital asset management vendor, in 2015.

It acquired Blue Software, a label and artwork management software vendor, in July 2018.

In December 2021, it launched a new inline colour measurement system.

In August 2022, it acquired Tillia Labs, an artificial intelligence software company.

In March 2023, the company launched Mox software.

In September 2023, Danaher completed the corporate spin-off its Environmental and Applied Solutions segment, including Esko, as Veralto.

In early 2025, the company sold Advanced Vision Technology.
