= Hengstler GmbH =

German manufacturing company

- Type: Subsidiary
- Industry: Counting and control components
- Founded: 1846; 180 years ago
- Founder: Johannes Hengstler
- Headquarters: Aldingen, Germany
- Area served: Worldwide
- Key people: Jochen Feiler, Matthew Moore, Andreas Wenzel
- Products: Rotary encoder, relay, mechanical counter, printer and cutter
- Number of employees: around 1,000
- Parent: Fortive
- Website: hengstler.com

Hengstler GmbH is a German manufacturing company which specializes in the production of industrial counting and control components. It is a subsidiary of Fortive and focuses on the international electro mechanic market.

== History ==
The watchmaker Johannes Hengstler started in 1846, in the south of Germany, with the series production of springs. Over the coming decades, the production was enlarged with relay, rotary encoder, mechanical counter and also printer & cutter.

In 1995, the company was acquired by Danaher Corporation, an American conglomerate with more than 400 operating companies. In 2016, Fortive was spun out of Danaher Corporation, and inherited Hengstler as one of its subsidiaries. Hengstler has prominent customers including Siemens, IBM, Festo and Bosch.

== Products ==
Hengstler provides complete project management with custom-made applications tailored to process control and environmental technology. The company manufactures incremental and absolute encoders, relays, mechanical counters, and industrial printers and cutters.

== International ==
Hengstler has a sister company in Slovakia, and branches in France, Italy, the United States and Asia.
