= IT8 =

Standards for color communications and control specifications

IT8 is a set of American National Standards Institute (ANSI) standards for color communications and control specifications. Formerly governed by the IT8 Committee, IT8 activities were merged with those of the Committee for Graphics Arts Technologies Standards (CGATS) in 1994.

== Standards list ==
The following is a list of the IT8 standards, according to the NPES Standards Blue Book:

=== IT8.6 - 2002 - Graphic technology - Prepress digital data exchange - Diecutting data (DDES3) ===
This standard establishes a data exchange format to enable transfer of numerical control information between diecutting systems and electronic prepress systems. The information will typically consist of numerical control information used in the manufacture of dies. 37 pp.

=== IT8.7/1 - 1993 (R2003) - Graphic technology - Color transmission target for input scanner calibration ===
This standard defines an input test target that will allow any color input scanner to be calibrated with any film dye set used to create the target. It is intended to address the color transparency products that are generally used for input to the preparatory process for printing and publishing. This standard defines the layout and colorimetric values of a target that can be manufactured on any positive color transparency film and that is intended for use in the calibration of a photographic film/scanner combination. 32 pp.

=== IT8.7/2 - 1993 (R2003) Graphic technology - Color reflection target for input scanner calibration ===
This standard defines an input test target that will allow any color input scanner to be calibrated with any film dye set used to create the target. It is intended to address the color photographic paper products that are generally used for input to the preparatory process for printing and publishing. It defines the layout and colorimetric values of the target that can be manufactured on any color photographic paper and is intended for use in the calibration of a photographic paper/scanner combination. 29 pp.

=== IT8.7/3 - 1993 (R2003) Graphic technology - Input data for characterization of 4-color process printing ===
The purpose of this standard is to specify an input data file, a measurement procedure and an output data format to characterize any four-color printing process. The output data (characterization) file should be transferred with any four-color (cyan, magenta, yellow and black) halftone image files to enable a color transformation to be undertaken when required. 29 pp.

== Targets ==
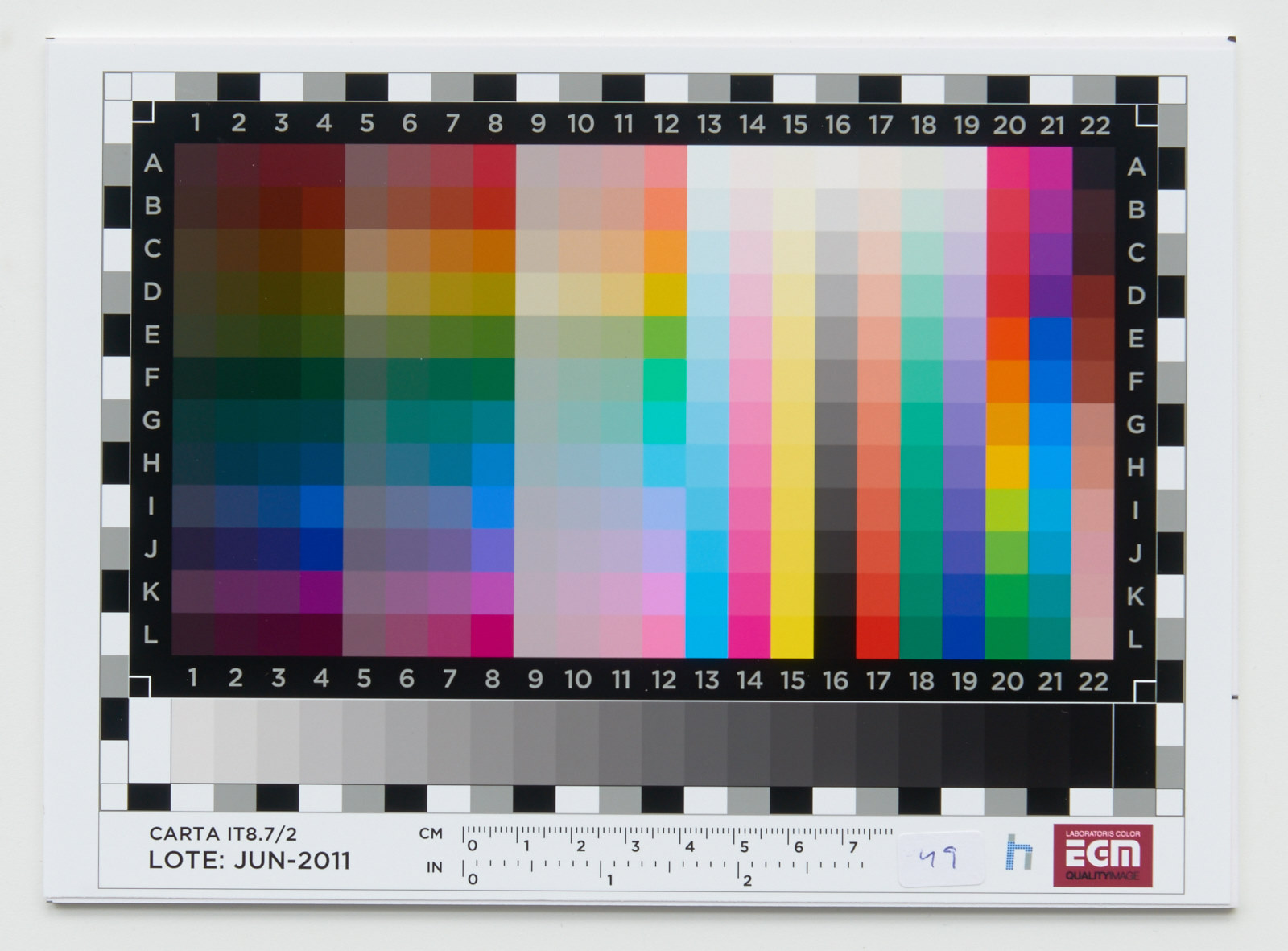
This is an IT8 color target made in EGM Laboratories in Barcelona, Spain. It has a very big gamut, slightly bigger than Adobe RGB color space.

Calibrating all devices involved in the process chain (original, scanner/digital camera, monitor/printer) is required for an authentic color reproduction, because their actual color spaces differ device-specifically from the reference color spaces.

An IT8 calibration is done with what are called IT8 targets, which are defined by the IT8 standards.

Example

Special targets, implementing the IT8.7/1 (transparent target) or IT8.7/2 (reflective target) standards, are needed for calibrating scanners. These targets consists of 24 grey fields and 264 color fields in 22 columns:

- Column 01 to 12: HCL color model, which differ in Hue, Chroma, and Lightness
- Column 13 to 16: CMYK-Colors Cyan, Magenta, Yellow, and Key (black) in different steps of brightness
- Column 17 to 19: RGB-Colors Red, Green, and Blue in different steps of brightness
- Column 20 to 22: undefined, producers' choice

After scanning such a target, an ICC profile gets calculated on the basis of reference values. This profile is used for all subsequent scans and assures color fidelity.

== See also ==
- List of colors
- Color chart
- Color calibration
- Color management
- Color mapping
- ICC profile
