= Klaer Lightende Spiegel der Verfkonst =

1692 book of color swatches

Scan of the book at Wikimedia Commons

The Klaer Lightende Spiegel der Verfkonst (literally: "clearly lighting mirror of the painting art") is a manuscript with over 700 pages of color swatches, produced in 1692 by a Dutch author from Delft known only as A. Boogert. The book is arranged according to the Aristotelian system rather than the spectrum, which had recently been described by Newton. Only one copy of the manual is known, and it is completely handwritten and hand-painted. It is kept in the Bibliothèque Méjanes in Aix-en-Provence.
