= Sequence of events recorder =

A sequence of events recorder (SER) is an intelligent standalone microprocessor based system, which monitors external inputs and records the time and sequence of the changes. They usually have an external time source such as a GPS or radio clock. When wired inputs change state, the time and state of each change is recorded.

SERs enable rapid root cause analysis after multiple events have occurred due to the secure recording of the sequence of events in the order of occurrence. SERs are therefore utilized as a diagnostic tool to minimize plant downtime. SERs are often interfaced with a SCADA system, distributed control system or programmable logic controller (PLC).

SER reports are used by electrical engineers to analyze large and small electrical system blackouts. After the Northeast blackout of 2003, the North American Electric Reliability Corporation specified that electrical system data should be time-tagged to the nearest millisecond.

In 1984, the Tetragenics Company, a subsidiary of the Montana Power Company, introduced the first remote terminal unit (RTU) that time-tagged events to the nearest millisecond, and now there are also other RTUs with this capability. Digital protective relays and some PLCs now also include time-tagging to the nearest millisecond; SCADA systems that incorporate these devices provide SER functions without a dedicated SER device.

== See also ==
- Data logger
