= X-Rite =

American color measurement company

X-Rite, Inc.
- Type: Subsidiary
- Founded: December 1958; 67 years ago
- Headquarters: Grand Rapids, Michigan, U.S.
- Parent: Veralto
- Subsidiaries: Pantone; Munsell Color Company
- Website: www.xrite.com

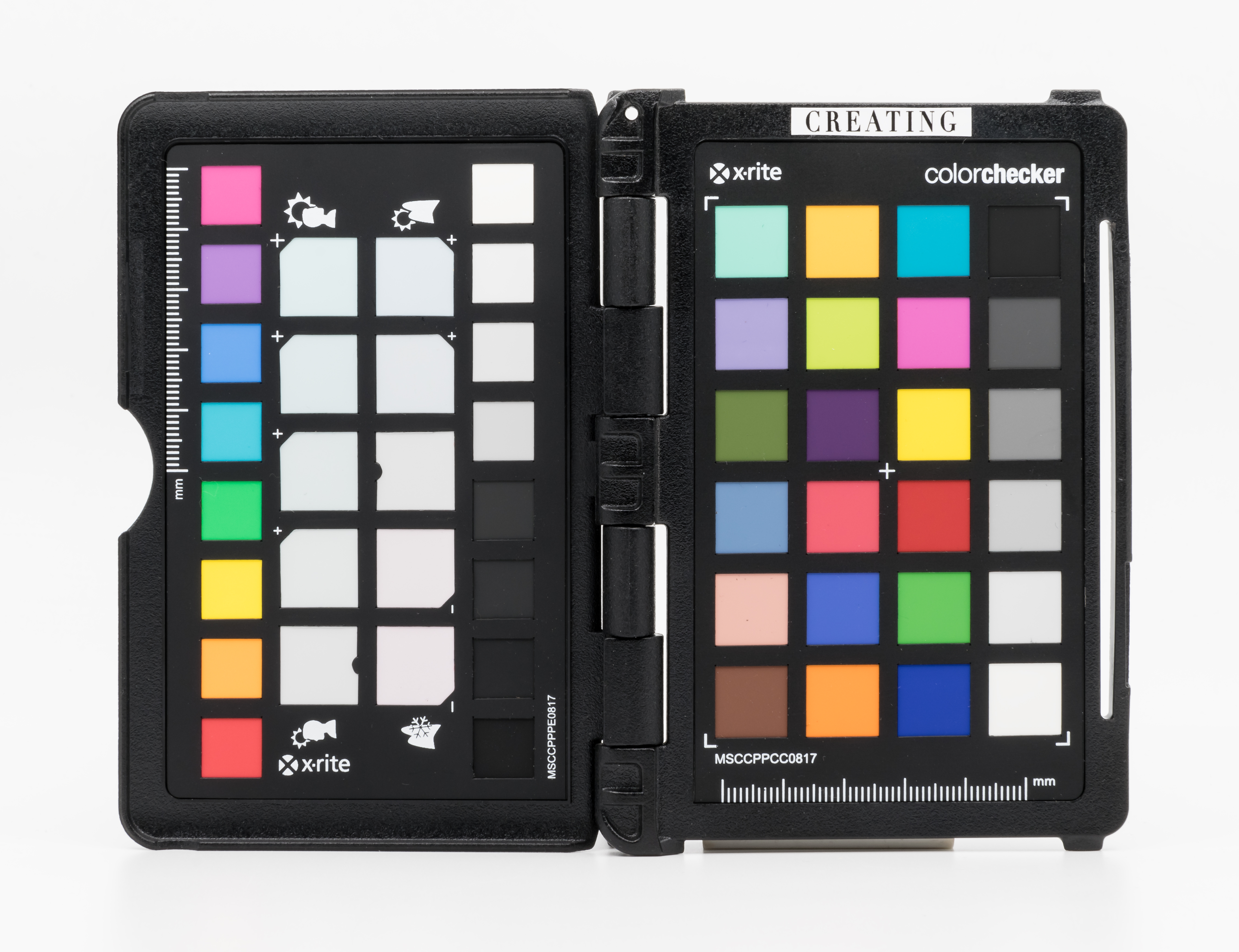
X-Rite ColorChecker Passport helps photographers get all the colors on their images real and find the right white balance.

X-Rite, Inc., headquartered in Grand Rapids, Michigan, is a manufacturer of color measurement and management products and products that regulate quality in the processing of film and x-rays.

== History ==
The firm was incorporated in 1958 by seven engineers from Lear Siegler. Its first product, x-ray marking tape, was introduced in 1968 and is the basis of the company name. In 1975, it introduced its first densitometer for photographic printing use.

The firm went public in 1986, and in 1987 moved into a new headquarters and production facility in Grandville, Michigan.

In 1966, it purchased H. Miller Graphic Arts.

By 1990, the firm shifted emphasis to colorimetry.

In 2006, it purchased Amazys, owners of Gretag–Macbeth and the Munsell color system.

In October 2007, it acquired Pantone.

In May 2012, X-Rite was acquired by Danaher Corporation for $625 million.

In September 2023, Danaher completed the corporate spin-off its Environmental and Applied Solutions segment, including X-Rite, as Veralto.

In November 2024, X-Rite acquired Colorware B.V., creators of MeasureColor.
