= Master station =

Network station to control other stations

In telecommunications, a master station is a station that controls or coordinates the activities of other stations in the system.

Examples:

- In a data network, the control station may designate a master station to ensure data transfer to one or more slave stations. Such a master station controls one or more data links of the data communications network at any given instant. The assignment of master status to a given station is temporary and is controlled by the control station according to the procedures set forth in the operational protocol. Master status is normally conferred upon a station so that it may transmit a message, but a station need not have a message to send to be designated the master station.
- In navigation systems using precise time dissemination, the master station is a station that has the clock that is used to synchronize the clocks of subordinate stations.
- In basic mode link control, the master station is a data station that has accepted an invitation to ensure a data transfer to one or more slave stations. At a given instant, there can be only one master station on a data link.

== Operation modes ==
In data transmission, a master station can be set to not wait for a reply from a slave station after transmitting each message or transmission block. In this case the station is said to be in "continuous operation".
