= Porter-Cable =

American power tool company

- Type: Subsidiary
- Industry: Manufacturing
- Founded: 1906; 120 years ago in Syracuse, New York, US
- Founders: R.E. Porter; G.G. Porter; F.E. Cable
- Headquarters: Jackson, Tennessee, US
- Key people: Art Emmons (Chief engineer)
- Products: Power tools; Pneumatic tools
- Parent: Stanley Black & Decker
- Website: portercable.com

Porter-Cable is an American company that manufactures power tools. Known for contributing to the development of the portable belt sander, helical-drive circular saw, and portable band saw, it is a subsidiary of Stanley Black & Decker.

== History ==
Porter-Cable was founded in 1906 in Syracuse, New York, by R.E. Porter, G.G. Porter, and F.E. Cable, who invested US$2,300 in a jobbing machine and tool shop. The trio operated the company out of a garage.

In 1914, the company began to focus on power tools, starting with a line of lathes. Three years later, the company bought a plant on North Salina Street in Syracuse.

In 1926, Porter-Cable began to develop a niche in portable electric power tools when Chief Engineer Art Emmons invented the portable electric belt sander, called the Take-About Sander.

In 1929, Emmons invented the helical drive circular saw, a compact, lightweight design that became the most widely used circular saw design produced.

In 1960, the company was sold to Rockwell International. Rockwell made numerous changes, including phasing out the Porter-Cable name, relocating the company's base of operations to Jackson, Tennessee, and creating a lower end of power tools to compete with Black & Decker. These tools had numerous reliability problems and harmed the brand's image.

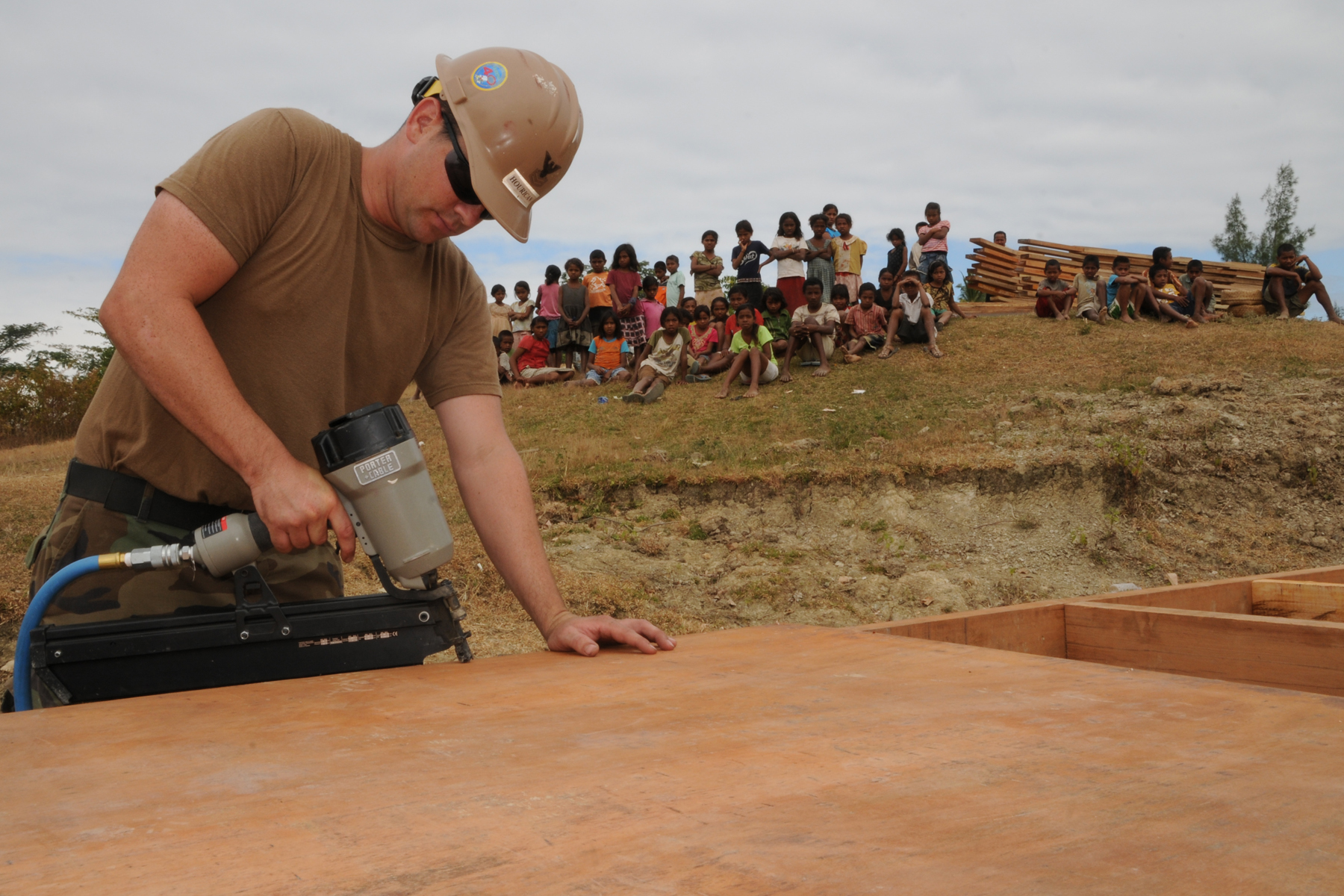
An pneumatic Porter-Cable nail gun in use (2009)

In 1981, Pentair, Inc. acquired Rockwell's power tool group—consisting of Porter-Cable and Delta Machinery—and restored the Porter-Cable name. The company ended production of consumer level tools, and re-positioned itself as a manufacturer of professional power tools.

In 1989, it introduced the first electric random orbital sander. Around this time, the company returned to consumer tools, sold via retail outlets which included The Home Depot and Lowe's, greatly expanding its sales.

In 1996, the Smithsonian Institution established a collection of materials from the company's ninety-year history, the first such effort for a power tool company.

In 2000, Porter-Cable consolidated with sister company Delta Machinery, the latter moving its headquarters and distribution center from Pittsburgh, Pennsylvania to Jackson, Tennessee. The same year, Pentair acquired DeVilbiss Air Power Company and, in 2002, Porter-Cable expanded its line-up to include air compressors, air tools, generators, and pressure washers.

In October 2004, the Pentair Tools Group—comprising Porter-Cable, Delta Machinery, DeVilbiss Air Power, and others—was purchased by Black & Decker, later becoming Stanley Black & Decker. Porter-Cable remained headquartered in Jackson, Tennessee. Its manufacturing in the United States has mostly ceased, with tools being primarily made in Mexico and China.

== See also ==
- Delta Machinery
- DeVilbiss Air Power Company
