= Nolan D. Archibald =

American businessman

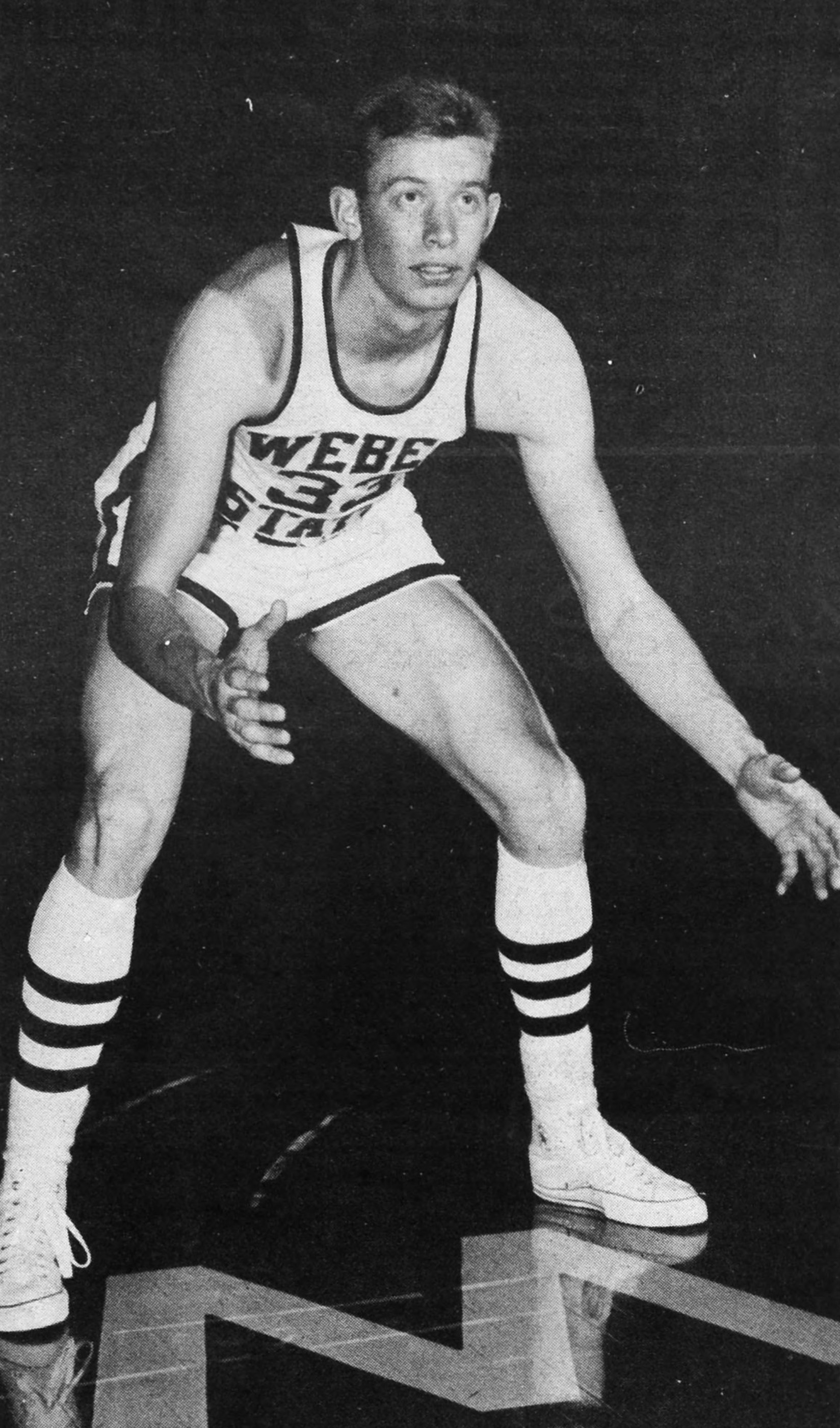
- Born: 1943 (age 82–83); Ogden, UT
- Known for: CEO of Black & Decker

Nolan D. Archibald (born 1943) is an American business executive, and the former chairman, president and chief executive officer of the Black & Decker Corporation. Following the merger with Stanley Works, Archibald became chairman of Stanley Black & Decker, Inc.

== Early life, education and athletics ==
Archibald graduated from Dixie State College (now Utah Tech University) where he was an honor student and All-American basketball player. He led his team to the National Junior College finals in Hutchinson, Kansas and was recruited by over 50 major universities in the United States. Archibald graduated from Weber State University, cum laude, where he was Scholar Athlete of the Year in 1968. He was an All-Conference basketball player under Coach Dick Motta and played on Weber State's first team to participate in the then 32-team NCAA basketball tournament. He was one of fifteen Division I basketball players out of 4,000 named an Academic All-American.

Archibald went on to earn a master's degree in business administration from the Harvard Business School in 1970. Archibald was invited in both 1969 and 1970 to try out for the Chicago Bulls in the National Basketball Association. He was offered a contract in 1970 to play for the Pittsburgh Pipers in the American Basketball Association.

In 1993, the National Association of Basketball Coaches honored Archibald, along with four other former All-American basketball players, (including Elvin Hayes), as their “Silver Anniversary NCAA All-American Basketball Team”. Archibald is the only athlete in Weber State's history to receive this honor.

== Career ==
Archibald held various management positions before leading the consumer durables division of the Beatrice Company, whose brands included Stiffel lamps, Samsonite luggage and Aristokraft kitchen cabinets. He joined Black & Decker as president and chief operating officer in September 1985. When appointed president and chief executive officer in March 1986 at the age of 42, Archibald was the youngest CEO of a Fortune 500 Company.

In 1989 Archibald made the near disastrous mis-step of out-bidding other companies to purchase Emhart Corporation for $2.8B financed by debt. Black & Decker was only able to service the debt because of profit from the launch of DeWalt in 1992 and subsequent success in becoming the world's largest professional and industrial power tools brand.

Archibald w as chief executive officer for 24 years and was the last CEO of Black & Decker. At the time of the merger with Stanley in March 2010, Archibald was the second longest-serving CEO of the largest 1000 companies in the United States that were not family controlled.

He is a recipient of the American Marketing Association’s Edison Achievement Award for significant and lasting contributions to marketing excellence and product innovation. He has been cited by Business Week as one of the top six managers in the United States and by Fortune Magazine as one of the country’s “ten most wanted” executives.

He is on the BYU Presidents Leadership Council and the Marriott National Advisory Council. He was Lead Director on the Huntsman Corporation's Board of Directors for many years. He was a member of the Board of Brunswick Corporation for 24 years, and was a member of the Lockheed Martin Corporation’s Board of Directors for 17 years. He was Lead Director on the Lockheed Martin Corporation’s Board of Directors. Other past board memberships include: ITT Corporation, the Johns Hopkins University Board of Trustees, the Board of Directors of the Associates of the Harvard Business School, and the Board of the NCAA National Association of Basketball Coaches.

== Personal life ==
Nolan Archibald is married.
