= Black+Decker =

American manufacturer of power tools

- Logo since 2014
- Type: Subsidiary
- Industry: Manufacturing
- Founded: September 1910; 116 years ago (as The Black & Decker Manufacturing Company) in Baltimore, Maryland, U.S.
- Founders: S. Duncan Black; Alonzo G. Decker
- Headquarters: 701 East Joppa Road; Towson, Maryland, U.S.
- Key people: Nolan D. Archibald (CEO)
- Products: Power tools; hardware; home improvement products; fastening technology
- Revenue: $11.41 billion (FY2016)
- Net income: $965.3 million (FY2016)
- Number of employees: 27,000
- Parent: Stanley Black & Decker
- Website: blackanddecker.com

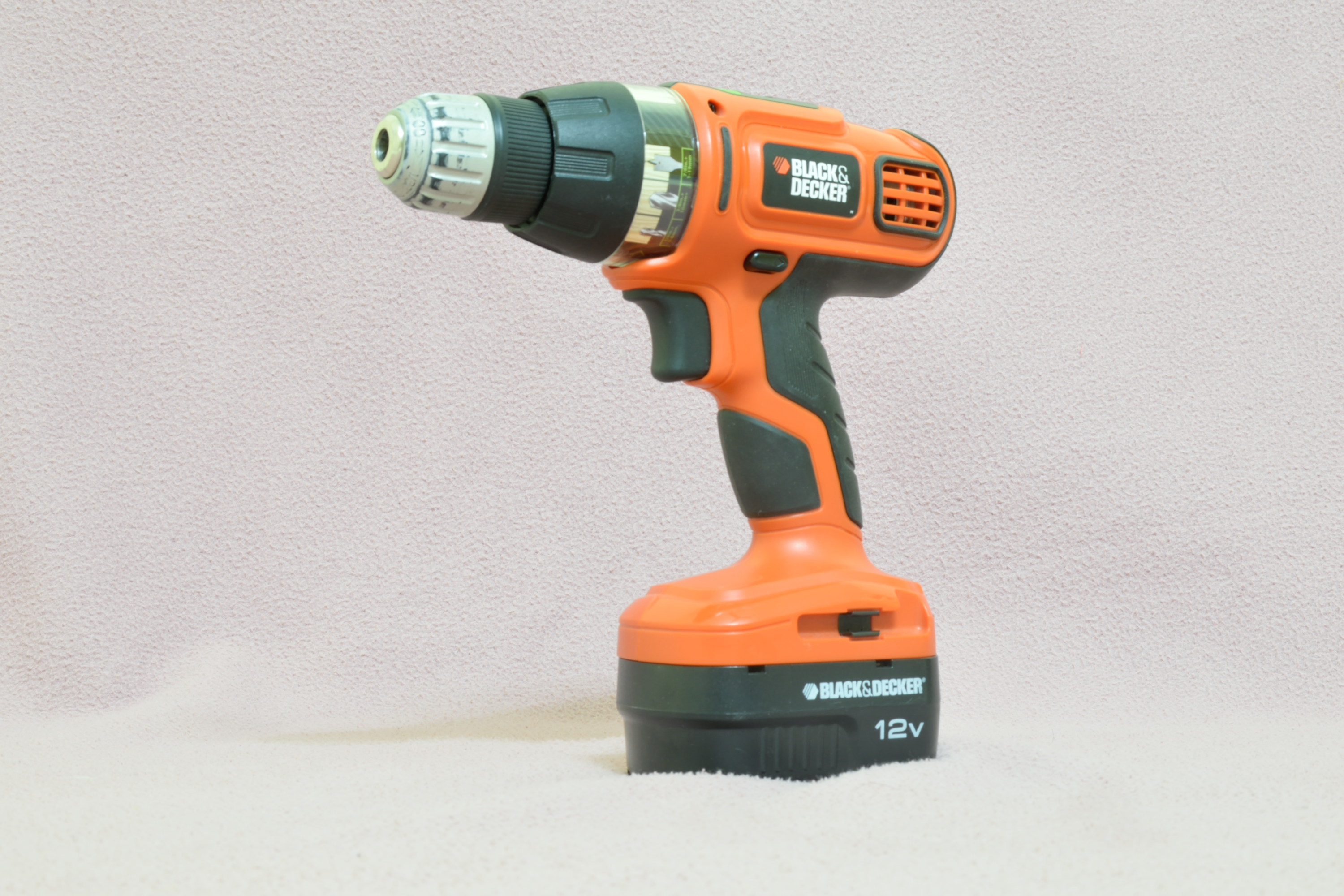
A Black & Decker cordless drill

Black+Decker is an American manufacturer of power tools, accessories, hardware, home improvement products, home appliances, and fastening systems, headquartered in Towson, Maryland, north of Baltimore, where the company was originally established in 1910. In March 2010, Black & Decker merged with Stanley Works to become Stanley Black & Decker. It remains a wholly owned subsidiary of that company.

== History ==
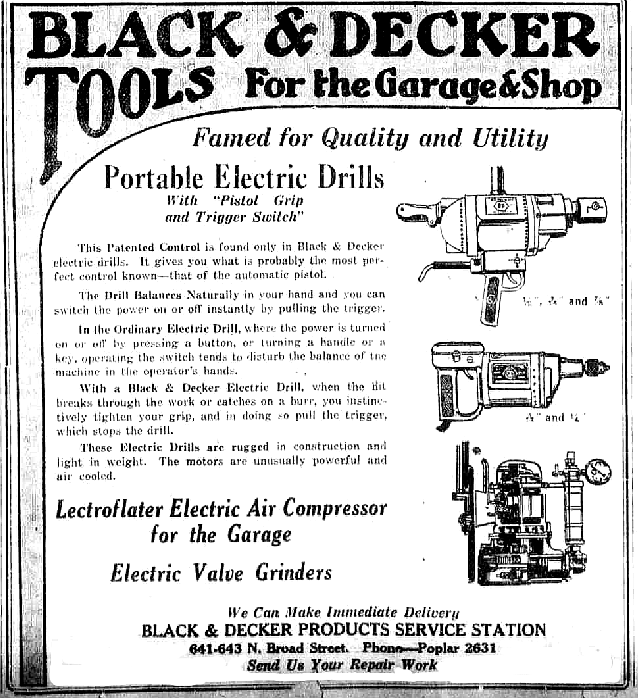
A 1920 ad for portable electric drills

=== 1910–1974 ===
- 1910 – "The Black & Decker Manufacturing Company" was founded by S. Duncan Black (1883–1951) and Alonzo G. Decker (1884–1956) as a small machine shop in Baltimore in September. Decker, who had only a seventh grade education, had met Black in 1906, when they were both 23-year-old workers at the Rowland Telegraph Company. With only $1,200 between them, one of their first jobs was designing machinery for making milk bottle caps and candy dipping.
- 1912 – The Black and Decker "Hexagon" logo symbol was introduced, symbolizing the head of a hexagonal bolt found in machine shops. It was used in one form or another from 1912 to 2014.
- 1917 – Black & Decker invented and patented the hand-held electric drill with a pistol grip and trigger switch.
  - –– For many decades the director of design was Glenn Calvin Wilhide, a friend of Walter Gropius and other industrial designers of the day. Wilhide filed many US patents for Black & Decker.
- 1917 – The first factory was opened in Towson, Maryland.
- 1919 – Company reaches $1,000,000 in sales.
- 1928 – Acquired the Van Dorn Electric Tool Company of Cleveland, Ohio.
- 1936 – Common stock begins trading on the New York Stock Exchange.
- 1939 - February, Wilhide's first patent for a portable power-driven unit granted.
- 1941 August – Wilhide's 2nd patent for a portable power driven tool unit granted.
- 1943 – Received the Army-Navy "E" Award for production, one of four World War II (1939/1941-1945) citations awarded to the company.
- 1949 – First Black & Decker U.S. trademark awarded.
- 1951 – Alonzo G. Decker Sr. becomes president
- 1960 – Acquired DeWalt from American Machine and Foundry.

=== 1975–2008 ===
- 1975 – Francis P. Lucier succeeded the son of one of the founders Alonzo G. Decker Jr.(1908-2002), as chairman of the board, the first time a family member did not hold the post.
- 1984 – Acquired small-appliance business from General Electric Company.
- 1986 – Nolan D. Archibald is named chief executive officer.
- 1989 – Acquired the Emhart Corporation which includes the brand names Kwikset, Price Pfister faucets, Molly wall anchors, POP rivets, True Temper (both hardware and sports equipment) and other consumer and commercial products. Inducted into the Space Foundation's Space Technology Hall of Fame for its cordless power tool achievements and contributions to NASA's Gemini and Apollo programs.
- 1990 – True Temper hardware is sold to Huffy, and then sold to US Industries, owner of Ames, which later became Ames True Temper, which is now owned by Griffon Corporation.
- 1996 – Sold small-appliance business to Windmere Durable Holdings. In May 2000, Windmere Durable Holdings changes its corporate name to Applica Inc.
- 2000 – Alonzo G. Decker Jr. resigns from the board, at age 92, two years before his death.

=== 2009–present ===
- 2010 – Black & Decker merges with Stanley Works to become Stanley Black & Decker.
- 2012 – Stanley Black & Decker sells its Hardware and Home Improvement group (HHI) to Spectrum Brands. Sale includes the lock business, as well as the related manufacturing subsidiary in Taiwan (Tong Lung). As of January 2023, Spectrum was in negotiations to sell its HHI assets to Swedish lock manufacturer Assa Abloy, but were making adjustments in response to the United States Department of Justice findings of antitrust issues.
- 2014 – Rebranded from Black & Decker to Black+Decker
- 2017 – Stanley Black & Decker purchases Craftsman from Sears (Sears, Roebuck & Company).
- 2017 – Stovekraft entered a licensing agreement with Black+Decker to sell the latter's products in the Indian market.
- 2025 - Indkal Technologies Pvt. Ltd. manufacturers and sells Black+Decker branded smart televisions in India.

== Brand portfolio ==
=== Recent ===
As of 2017, Stanley Black & Decker's brand portfolio included:

- STANLEY (formerly known as The Stanley Works; started in 1843 as Stanley's Bolt Manufactory by Frederick Trent Stanley, and merged in 1920 with the Stanley Rule and Level Company founded by Henry Stanley in 1857)
- Aero Scout
- Black+Decker
- Bostitch
- Consolidated Aerospace Manufacturing
- Craftsman
- DeWalt
- Facom, Mac Tools, Proto
- Inner Space
- Irwin
- Lenox
- Piranha
- Porter-Cable
- Sonitrol
- STANLEY Access Technologies
- STANLEY Engineered Fastening
- STANLEY Healthcare
- STANLEY Infrastructure
- STANLEY Security
- Vidmar

=== Former ===
- Baldwin (sold to Spectrum Brands)
- Delta Machinery (sold to Chang Type Industrial)
- Elu (the brand was discontinued and the products continued to be sold under the DeWalt brand)
- DeVilbiss Air Power (sold to MAT Holdings)
- Kwikset (sold to Spectrum Brands)
- Price Pfister (sold to Spectrum Brands)
- Weiser Lock (sold to Spectrum Brands)
