= Pneumatic tool =

Tool driven by compressed air supplied by an air compressor

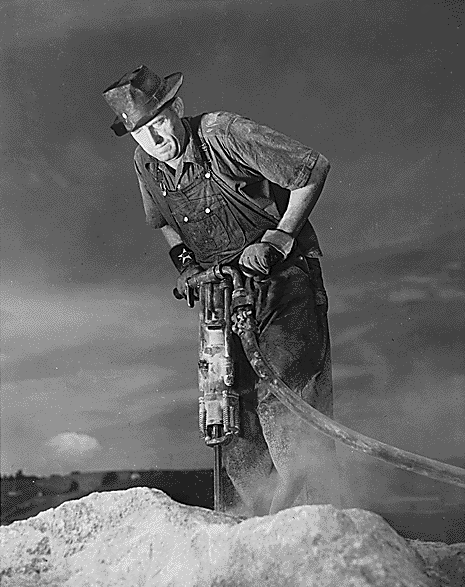
- Drilling a blast hole with a pneumatic drill (jackhammer)
- Classification: Power tool
- Types: Compressed air or compressed carbon dioxide
- Inventor: (Multiple, see Jackhammer § History); Samuel Miller (steam-powered drill, 1806); Jonathan J. Couch (percussion drill, 1849); François Cavé (compressed air drill, 1851); Charles Brady King (pneumatic hammer, 1890)
- Related: Air compressor, Hydraulic tool, Electric tool

A pneumatic tool, air tool, air-powered tool or pneumatic-powered tool is a type of power tool, driven by compressed air supplied by an air compressor. Pneumatic tools can also be driven by compressed carbon dioxide (CO_{2}) stored in small cylinders allowing for portability.

Most pneumatic tools convert the compressed air to work using a pneumatic motor. Compared to electric power tool equivalents, pneumatic tools are safer to run and maintain, without risk of sparks, short-circuiting or electrocution, and have a higher power to weight ratio, allowing a smaller, lighter tool to accomplish the same task. Furthermore, they are less likely to self-destruct in case the tool is jammed or overloaded.

General grade pneumatic tools with a short life span are commonly less expensive and considered “disposable tools” in tooling industries, while industrial grade pneumatic tools with long life span are more expensive. In general, pneumatic tools are cheaper than the equivalent electric-powered tools. Regular lubrication of the tools is still needed however.

== Advantages and disadvantages ==
Pneumatic tools have many benefits which have contributed to their rise in popularity. The benefits of using compressed air to power tools are:

- Inexpensive
- Safe to use
- Easy to operate
- Portable
- Low theft rates

The primary disadvantage of pneumatic tools is the need for an air compressor, which can be expensive. Pneumatic tools also need to be properly maintained and oiled regularly. Failing to maintain tools can lead to deterioration, due to a build up of residual oil and water.

== Technical terms ==
Pneumatic tools are rated using several metrics: Free Speed (rpm), Air Pressure (psi/bar), Air Consumption (cfm/scfm or m3/min), Horse Power (hp), and spindle size. Each individual tool has its own specific requirements which determine their compatibility with air compressor systems.

Flow or airflow, related to air consumption in pneumatic tools, represents the quantity of compressed air that passes through a section over a unit of time. It is represented in l/min, m3, at the equivalent value in free air in conditions of standard reference atmosphere (SRA). For example: +20 c, 65% of relative humidity, 1013 mbar, in accordance with norms NFE.

== Types of pneumatic tools ==
Pneumatic tools come in many shapes and form, including small and large-sized hand tools.

The most common types of pneumatic tools include:

- Air ratchet
- Airbrush
- Air hammer (forging)
- Air hammer (pile driver)
- Angle grinder
- Backfill tamper
- Impact wrenches
- Nail gun
- Jackhammer
- Pneumatic hammer
- Pneumatic drill
- Pneumatic jack (device)
- Pneumatic paint shaker
- Pneumatic riveter
- Sanders
- Sandblaster
- Shears
- Paint sprayer
- Riveting hammer
- Air saw
- Blind riveter
- Needle scaler

== Common brands ==
- Chicago Pneumatic
- Kirloskar Pneumatic
- AIMCO
- Apex Tool Group
- Atlas Copco
- ZIPP GROUP
- Campbell Hausfeld
- 3M
- China Pneumatic
- Compair Broomwade Ltd
- Craftsman
- DeVilbiss Air Power Company
- Festo
- Husky (tools)
- Ingersoll-Rand
- JET
- Kobalt (tools)
- Mac Tools
- Makita
- Matco Tools
- Osaka
- Patco Air Tools
- Porter-Cable
- RAD Torque Systems
- Snap-on
- ZIPP TOOL
- Katashi
