= Delta Machinery =

Power tool brand

Delta Power Equipment Corp.
- Type: Private
- Industry: Manufacturing
- Predecessor: Delta Machinery division of Stanley Black & Decker
- Founded: 1919; 107 years ago Milwaukee, Wisconsin, U.S.
- Founder: Herbert Tautz
- Headquarters: Spartanburg, South Carolina
- Key people: Kevin Chang, CEO/President Ben Tsai, CFO; Conrad LaRosa, Dir. of Marketing, Sales E-Commerce Steve Coghill, Dir of Product Development
- Products: 10" Unisaw; 26-2312 12" Dual Bevel Miter Saw; 28-400 14" Band Saw
- Website: deltamachinery.com

Delta Power Equipment Corp. designs, manufactures and distributes power woodworking tools under the Delta Machinery brand.

== History ==
Delta traces its roots to the Delta Specialty Company founded by Herbert Tautz in 1919 in Milwaukee, Wisconsin. Based at first in Tautz' garage, Delta Specialty Company thrived, first making small tools for home shops and later expanding into light industrial machinery.

In 1945, Rockwell Manufacturing Company acquired Delta Machinery and renamed it the Delta Power Tool Division of Rockwell Manufacturing Company and continued to manufacture in Milwaukee.

In 1966, Rockwell invented the world's first power miter saw.

In 1981, Rockwell's power tool group was acquired by Pentair and re-branded Delta Machinery.

In 2004, Pentair's Tools group was acquired by Black & Decker.

== Current ownership ==
In January, 2011, Taiwan-based Chang Type Industrial Co., Ltd. purchased the Delta brand from Stanley Black & Decker. Chang Type formed a wholly owned subsidiary, Delta Power Equipment Corp. to own the acquired assets including trademarks, designs and industrial tooling. Chang Type is moving Delta's production tooling from a Stanley Black & Decker owned facility in Jackson, Tennessee to a facility in Anderson County, South Carolina. Most recently, Delta has purchased an improved facility in Spartanburg, SC and has moved all operations to this location.
