= MAT Holdings =

MAT Industries LLC
- Type: Private
- Industry: Manufacturing
- Headquarters: Long Grove, Illinois
- Website: MAT Holdings

MAT Holdings, Inc. is an American company that manufactures MAT Industries air compressors, pneumatic tools, pressure washers, and accessories. Gabriel Shock & Struts; Midwest Air Technologies (Fencing, Pet Containment, Lawn & Garden accessories, and other consumer goods; MAT Logistics, distribution and 3PL; and MATHD Heavy Duty Brake relining divisions.

The main company was founded in 1984. In 1999 Devilbiss Air Power Co. was acquired by Pentair. Pentair sold the company to Black & Decker in 2004. Following the 2010 merger of Stanley Works and Black and Decker, the new Stanley Black & Decker sold DeVilbiss Air Power to MAT Holdings on March 31, 2011.
