= Stovekraft =

Indian cooking appliances manufacturer

- Type: Public
- Traded as: NSE: STOVEKRAFT; BSE: 543260
- Founded: 1999
- Founder: Rajendra Gandhi
- Headquarters: Bangalore, Karnataka, India
- Key people: Rajendra Gandhi (Chairman & MD); Neha Gandhi (Director)
- Products: Kitchen appliances, cookware
- Revenue: ▲₹1,607 crore (US$170 million) (FY 2026)
- Website: www.stovekraft.com

Stovekraft is an Indian company that manufactures cooking appliances, cookware BLDC fans and grooming products.

The company was founded in 1999 and is headquartered in Bangalore, Karnataka. Among its cooking appliances are mixer grinders, pressure cookers, cooktops, toasters, chimneys, air fryers and kitchen utensils. It sells its products in 23 states in India and 12 countries overseas.

Stovekraft was honoured for excellence at the ET Great Indian Retail Awards 2025

== History ==
Stovekraft operates two manufacturing plant in India including Bangalore and Baddi, Himachal Pradesh. The Bangalore Unit is spread across 50 Acres Land and manufacture most of Kitchen and Home Appliances products.

Around 80 percent of Stovekraft's employees reportedly are women.

The company launched its initial public offering (IPO) in January 2021, raising more than ₹412 crore (US$43 million). The company was listed on the NSE and BSE on 5 February 2021.

The company has started manufacturing for Ikea at its Harohalli facility.

Stovekraft operates 2 brands, Pigeon and Gilma. Gilma is its premium range of Kitchen chimneys, Cooktops, built-ins and air fryers. Stovekraft has set up over 329 Pigeon exclusive brand stores across India.

The company sells through general trade in over 1,25,000 outlets, modern trade stores, on ecommerce marketplaces and through its exclusive brand outlets.
