= Screw gun =

Type of power tool

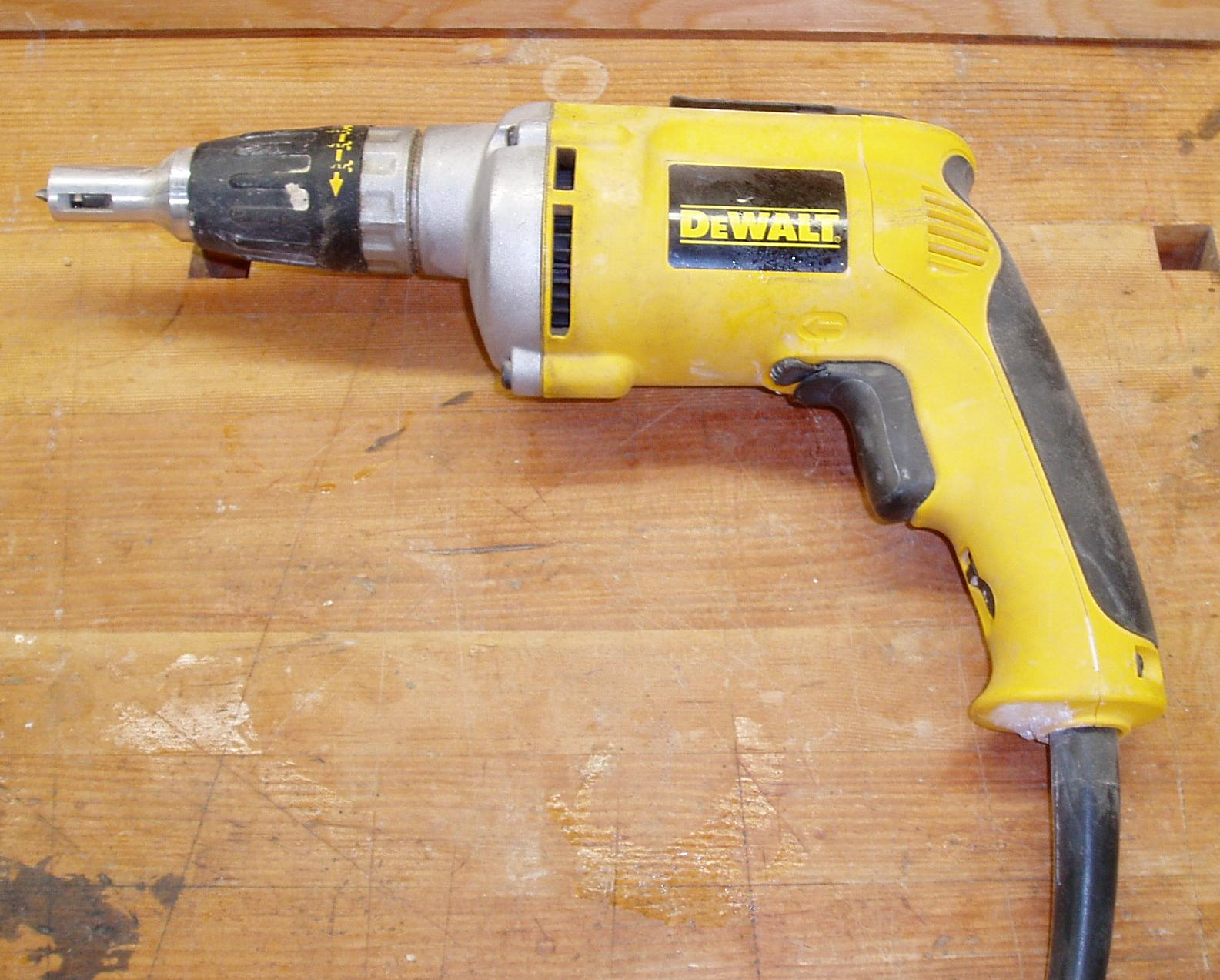
A DeWalt corded drywall screw gun.

A screw gun is similar to a power drill, but designed specifically for driving screws. A screw gun looks like a drill, but has a "nose" instead of a chuck. The nose holds an interchangeable 1/4-inch (6.4 mm) shank bit, commonly known as a tip. The most common types of tips are 1 inch (25 mm) No. 2 Phillips, T25 Torx, and flatheads. The nose on either type of screw gun can be adjusted to countersink screws to the desired depth. The user must apply pressure to the bit to engage the clutch and drive the screws.

== Types of screw guns ==
Some screw guns drive one screw at a time; the user manually places each screw on the tip. Screw guns also exist with autofeed mechanisms, with which each time one finishes driving a screw, another screw gets automatically loaded onto the tip. The most common autofeed mechanism uses collated screws, which means a strip of screws held together by plastic. A screw gun that uses collated screws is known as a collated screw gun.

Some screw guns can be set to stop driving the screw at a certain depth, which may be up to two inches below the surface. It is possible to drive a series of screws with the motor running continuously, and many manufacturers recommend doing this to install drywall.

Screw guns of all these types are available in corded and cordless variants.

== Screw gun vs power drill and impact driver ==
Power drills are used to drill holes into materials and attach multiple materials with a variety of fasteners. Impact drivers are used to tighten or loosen fasteners with a hammer that provides greater torque for more power. Significant features for driving screws that they lack are the ability to set depth and autofeed.

== Sources ==
- Lee Jesberger (2010). Pro Remodelinging Tips.com.
