= Vidmar =

Vidmar is the 9th most frequent surname in Slovenia and is also found in Croatia. In Slovenia, it is present throughout the country, but it is most common in central and southern Slovenia, as well as in parts of the Slovenian Littoral.

== People ==
- Andrej Vidmar (born 1956), Yugoslav ice hockey player
- Aurelio Vidmar (born 1967), Australian soccer player and manager
- Gašper Vidmar (born 1987), Slovenian basketball player
- Igor Vidmar (born 1950), Slovenian journalist, activist, and music producer
- Ivan Vidmar, aviation pioneer
- Janja Vidmar (born 1962), Slovenian author and screenwriter
- John Vidmar, American theologian
- Josip Vidmar (1895–1992), Slovenian littérateur and politician
- Jože Vidmar (born 1963), Slovenian canoeist
- Luka Vidmar (born 1986), Slovenian ice hockey player
- Maja Vidmar (born 1961), Slovenian poet
- Maja Vidmar (climber) (born 1985), Slovenian rock climber
- Meta Vidmar (1899–1975), Slovenian dancer
- Milan Vidmar (Senior, 1885–1962), Slovenian electrical engineer, chess grandmaster
- Milan Vidmar, Jr. (1909–1980), Slovenian electrical engineer, chess player; son of Milan
- Nejc Vidmar (born 1989), Slovenian football player
- Peter Vidmar (born 1961), American gymnast
- Tony Vidmar (born 1970), Australian soccer player

== Businesses ==
- Vidmar is a US-based industrial storage company owned by Stanley Black & Decker, bought by Stanley Works in 1966.
