= DeWalt =

American professional tools manufacturer

DeWalt Industrial Tool Company
- Type: Subsidiary
- Industry: Manufacturing
- Founded: 1924; 102 years ago
- Headquarters: Towson, Maryland, U.S.
- Products: Power tools
- Number of employees: 13,000
- Parent: Stanley Black & Decker
- Website: www.dewalt.com

The DeWalt Industrial Tool Company is an American worldwide manufacturer of power tools and hand tools for the construction, manufacturing and woodworking industries, as well as home craftspeople. DeWalt is a registered trademark of Black & Decker, a subsidiary of Stanley Black & Decker.

== History ==
The original company was started in 1924 in Leola, Pennsylvania, by Raymond E. DeWalt, inventor of the radial arm saw. It grew quickly and was reorganized and reincorporated in 1947 as DeWalt Inc. American Machine & Foundry Co., Inc. bought the company in 1949, and sold it to Black & Decker in 1960. Black & Decker divested itself of the radial arm saw manufacturing branch in 1989, selling it to two executives.

In 1992, Black & Decker began a major effort to rebrand its professional quality and high-end power tools to DeWalt. In 1994, DeWalt took over the German woodworking power tool producer ELU, and used ELU's technology to expand their tool line. As of 2001, they manufactured and sold more than 200 hand power tools and 800 accessories.

DeWalt is now a popular brand of tools for commercial contractors. In 2004, Black and Decker bought rival power tool manufacturer Porter-Cable and combined it with DeWalt in Jackson, Tennessee. In 2011, DeWalt launched a line of contractors' hand tools (including utility knives, pliers, adjustable wrenches, tape measures, saws, and hammers). In 2013, it was expanded to include mechanics' tools, including wrenches, ratchets and sockets.

In December 2013, DeWalt announced it would begin assembling a small selection of their products in the United States, using parts manufactured in Brazil, China, the Czech Republic, Italy, Mexico, the United Kingdom and the U.S., and that these products would be labeled "Built in the USA with global materials." As of 2015, they have seven U.S. manufacturing facilities:

- Charlotte, North Carolina
- Cheraw, South Carolina
- Greenfield, Indiana
- Hampstead, Maryland
- Jackson, Tennessee
- New Britain, Connecticut
- Shelbyville, Kentucky

In April 2016, DeWalt created an Android-powered smartphone designed for building industry workers. It costs $544, is designed to survive a 2 m (6 ft 7 in) drop onto concrete, and has an operating range of −20 to 60 °C (−4 to 140 °F).

On September 1, 2016, DeWalt debuted its FlexVolt hybrid voltage battery pack that can switch between series battery wiring providing 60 V (54 V nominal) and 2 Ah, or parallel wiring for 20 V (18 V nominal) and 6 Ah, depending on whether it is installed in a 60 V or 20 V tool, determined by communication between the tool and battery.

Around May 2017, DeWalt began integrating its Bluetooth-capable ToolConnect technology into its drills and impact drivers. ToolConnect integrates with DeWalt's mobile app to provide fleet management tracking, tool diagnostics, and custom tool profiles. Currently, only DeWalt's high-end power tools include ToolConnect built natively into the tool, though some models include a ToolConnect slot in the base to add connectivity when buying a separate after-market ToolConnect chip. For example, the DeWalt 20 V Max XR DCF888 impact driver has ToolConnect built natively into the tool whereas the DeWalt 20 V Max XR DCF845 impact driver has a slot to insert a ToolConnect chip should the user decide to add this connectivity after purchase.

In May 2018, it released a line of 20 V and 40 V cordless lawn mowers.

In September 2022, DeWalt launched POWERSTACK battery technology and became the first power tool manufacturer to launch a battery platform that leverages pouch style, lithium-ion battery technology, for their power tools.

== Brand launching ==
Black & Decker was long associated with lighter weight consumer tools such as domestic appliances, and not the heavy duty equipment professional builders wanted. Towards the end of the 1980s, Michael Hammes, executive vice president and president of the company's power tools and home improvement group, introduced the "Acura concept," a notion Honda utilized to enter the upscale automobile market. Black & Decker found it useful to reintroduce a name with little appeal to many consumers in the market for construction tools.

DeWalt was acquired in 1960 and continued to produce radial arm saws, table saws, belt/disc sanders and other stationary power equipment. In 1992, Black & Decker introduced a few models of hand power tools under the DeWalt label to the consumer and tradesman market. These tools were merely rebadged models from the Black & Decker "Professional" and "Kodiak" lines with a new yellow housing and an expanded warranty and service policy. Both lines were shortly thereafter discontinued in favor of the DeWalt label and its growing popularity. In a market survey of the United States done by Black & Decker before its reintroduction, the name DeWalt was recognized by 70% percent of tradespersons.

== Sponsorship ==
=== NASCAR ===
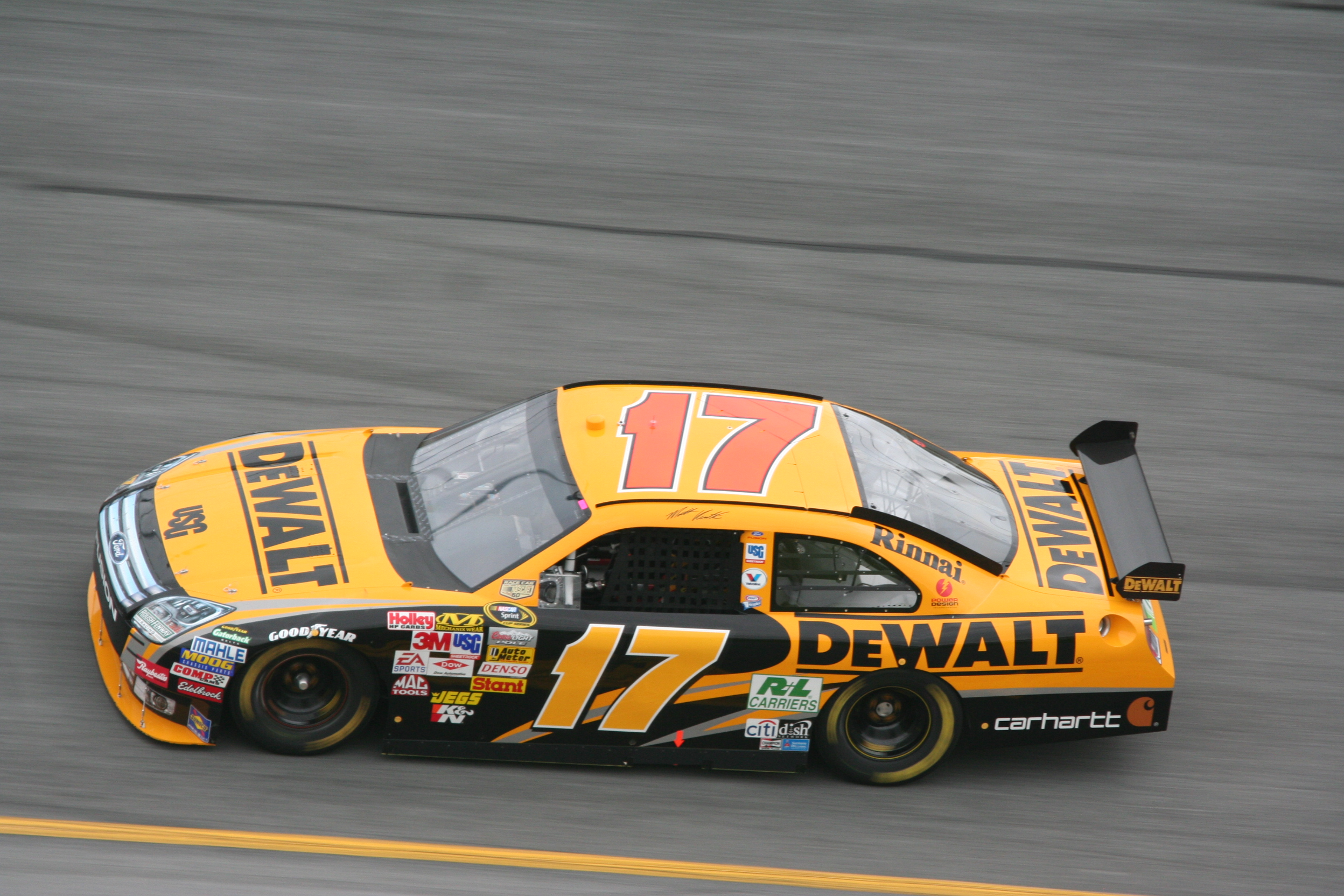
DeWalt Ford Fusion in 2008, driven by Matt Kenseth

DeWalt Tools sponsored NASCAR driver Matt Kenseth from 1999 through to the season of 2009. In this time period, Kenseth won 18 races, the 2000 Sprint Cup Rookie of the Year Award, 2003 Winston Cup Series Championship, 2004 NEXTEL Cup All Star Race and the 2009 Daytona 500.

However, in July 2009, DeWalt announced that they would not be renewing their sponsorship deal with Kenseth and Roush Fenway Racing due to the poor economic conditions in the construction industry. DeWalt had also sponsored MotoGP rider, Ben Spies, for the racing season of 2010.

DeWalt returned to NASCAR sponsorship in 2011, but on the #9 Richard Petty Motorsports Ford Fusion driven by Marcos Ambrose. This sponsorship ended after 2014, when Ambrose departed the Sprint Cup Series, with DeWalt choosing to re-unite with Kenseth, who now drove the #20 for Joe Gibbs Racing, sponsoring six races in 2015, ten races in 2016 and 15 races in 2017.

When Kenseth retired after the season of 2017, DeWalt moved to his replacement in the #20 Erik Jones and parent company Stanley sponsors Joe Gibbs Racing teammate Daniel Suárez. As of 2021, DeWalt sponsors Christopher Bell in the 20 car.

=== Formula One ===
On July 15, 2021, McLaren announced a multi-year partnership with Black & Decker. DeWalt will be the official tool and storage supplier for the McLaren Formula One team. DeWalt will be featured on the car's rear wing endplates and on the drivers' racing suits.

=== Football ===
DeWalt signed a sleeve sponsorship deal with AFC Bournemouth in 2022.

== Gallery ==
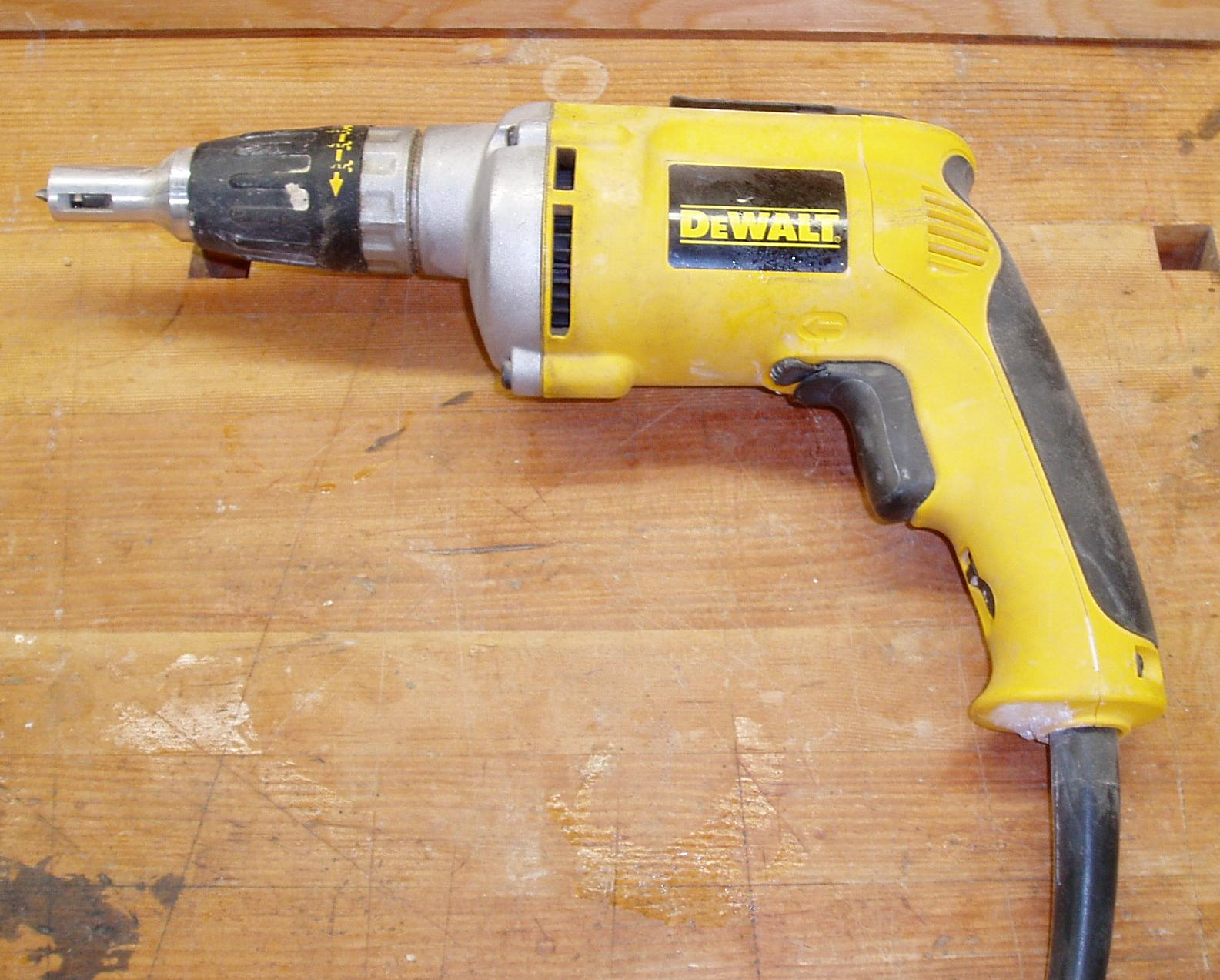
A DeWalt screw gun, used for countersinking drywall screws

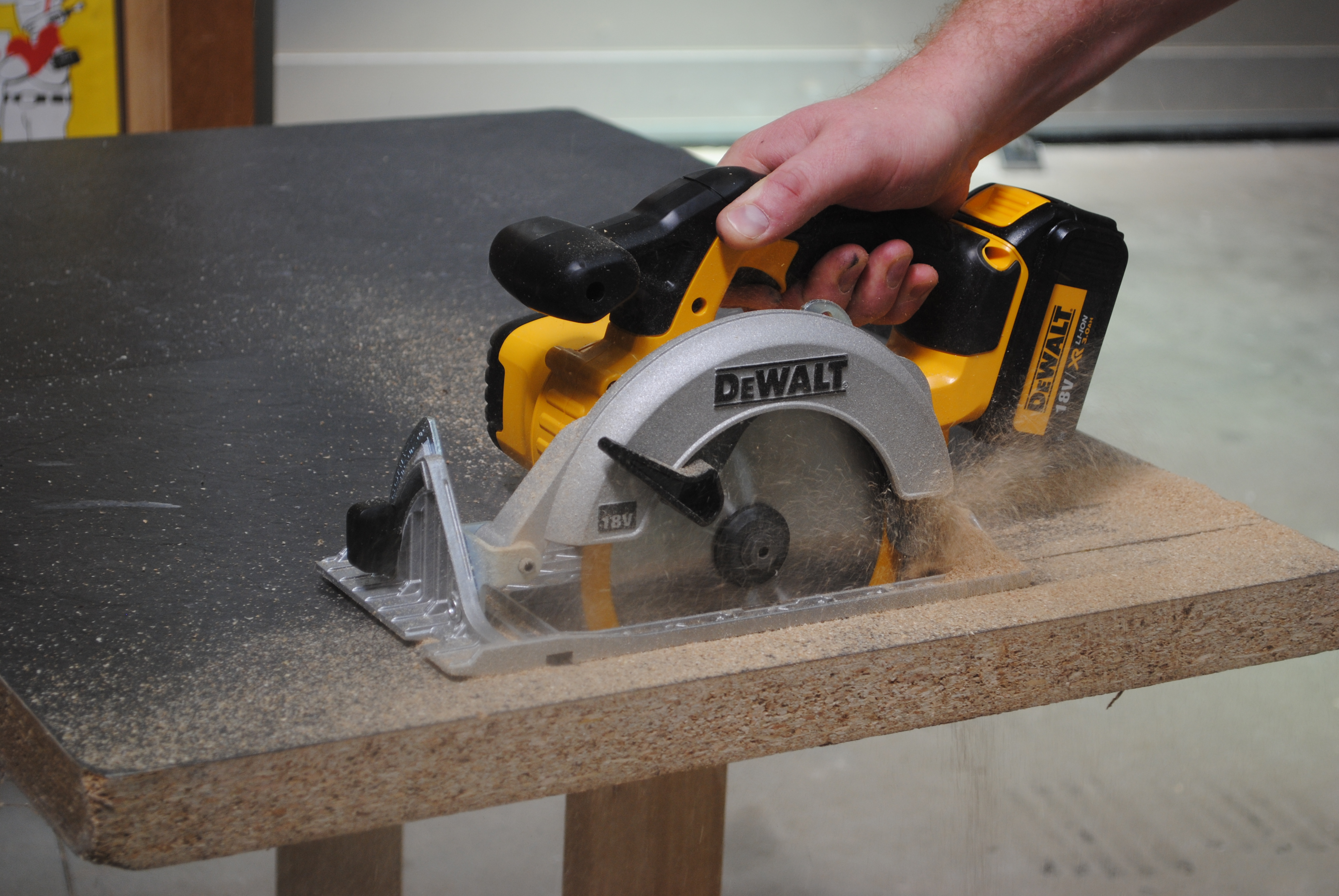
A DeWalt circular saw

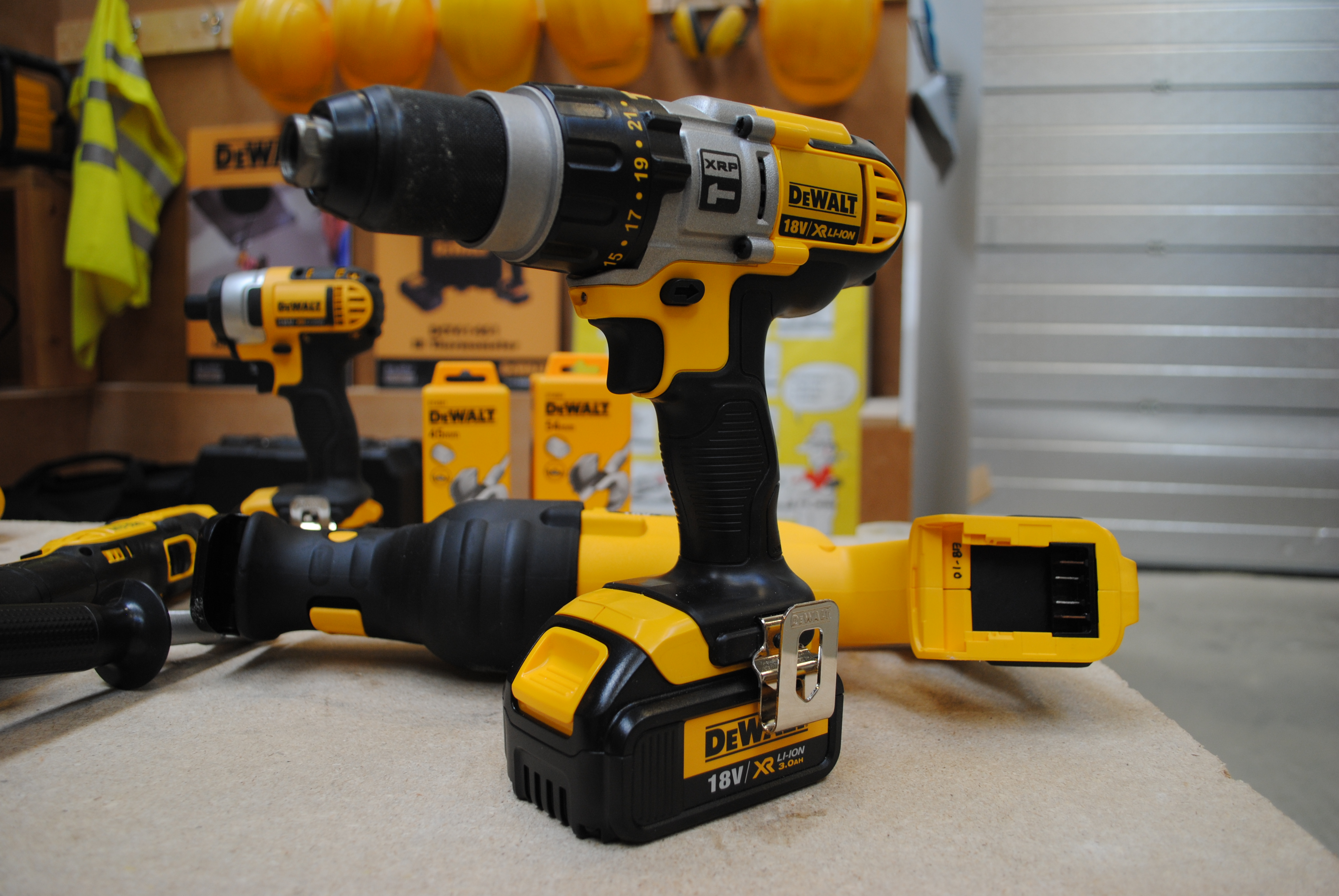
A DeWalt hammer drill

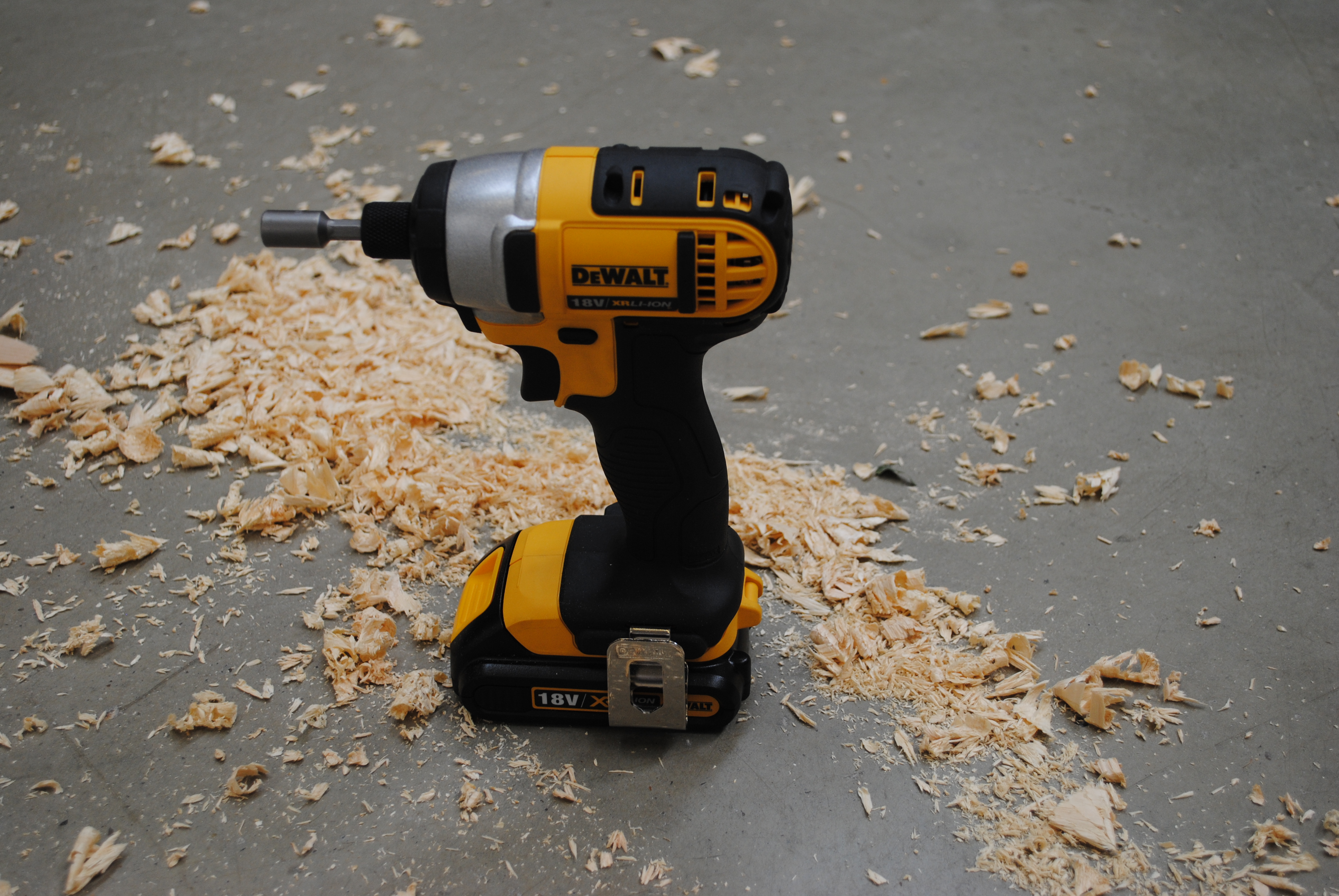
A DeWalt impact driver

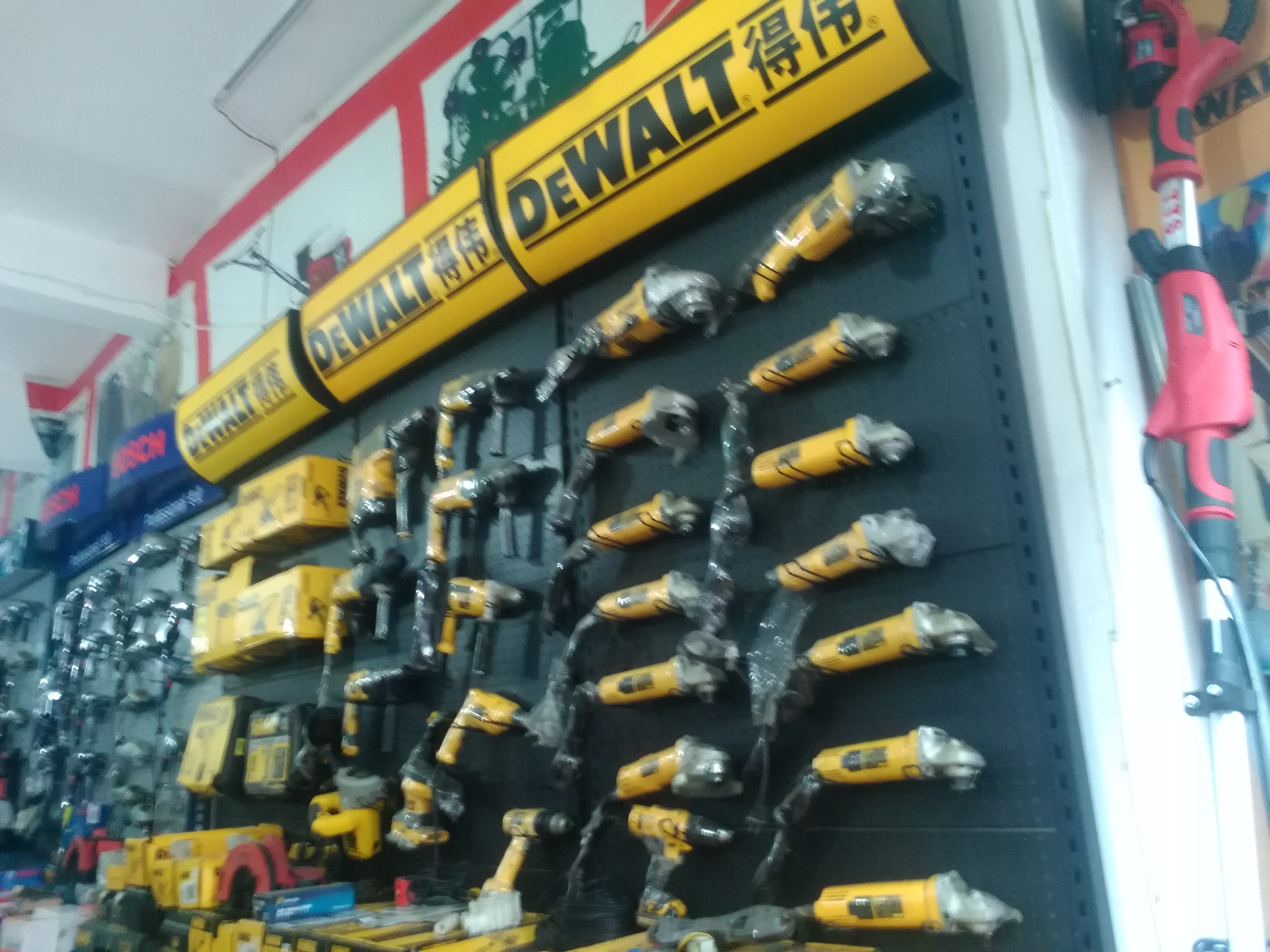
DeWalt tools on sale in China

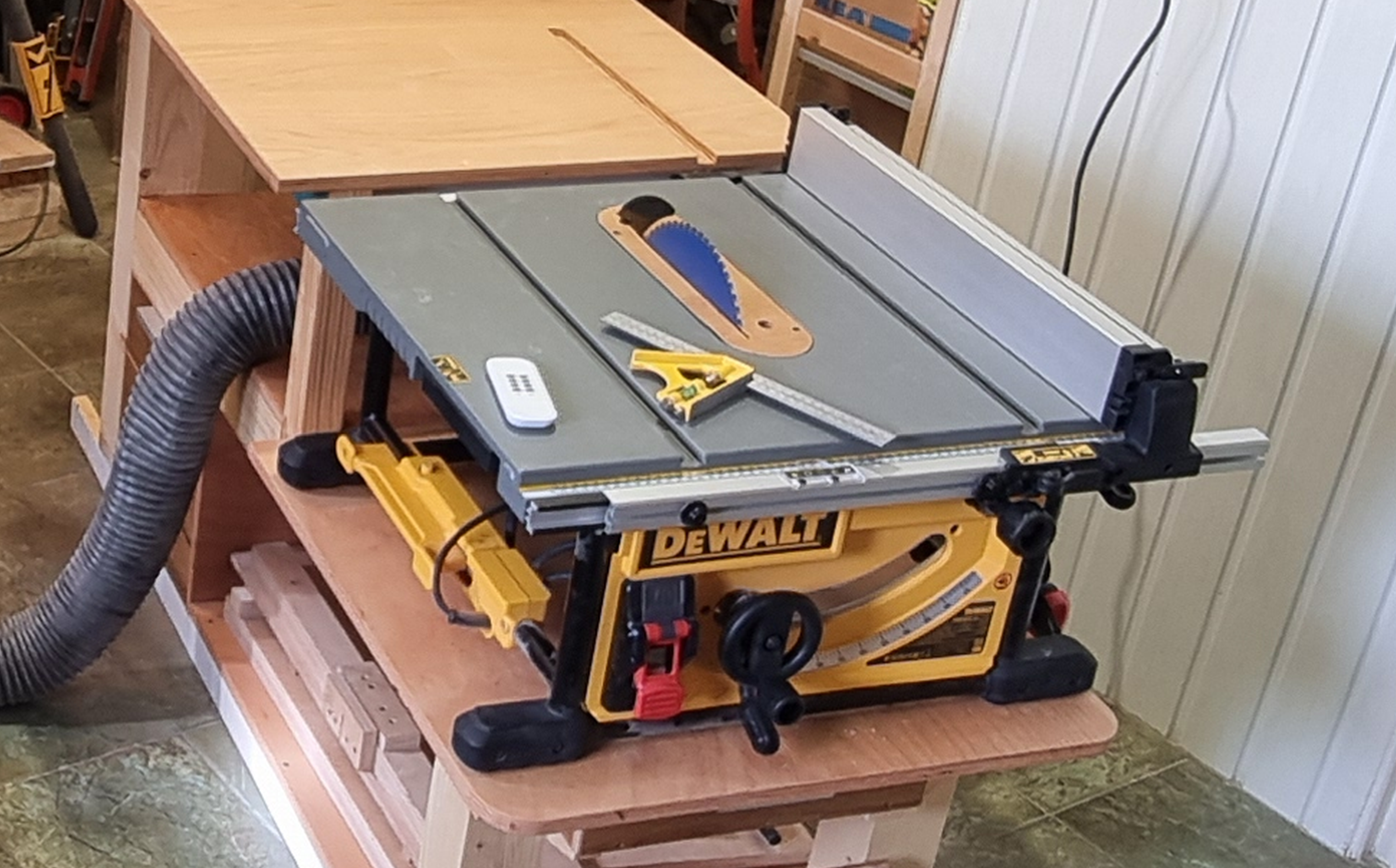
Dewalt tablesaw, one of their trademark tools
