= Nail gun =

Type of power tool

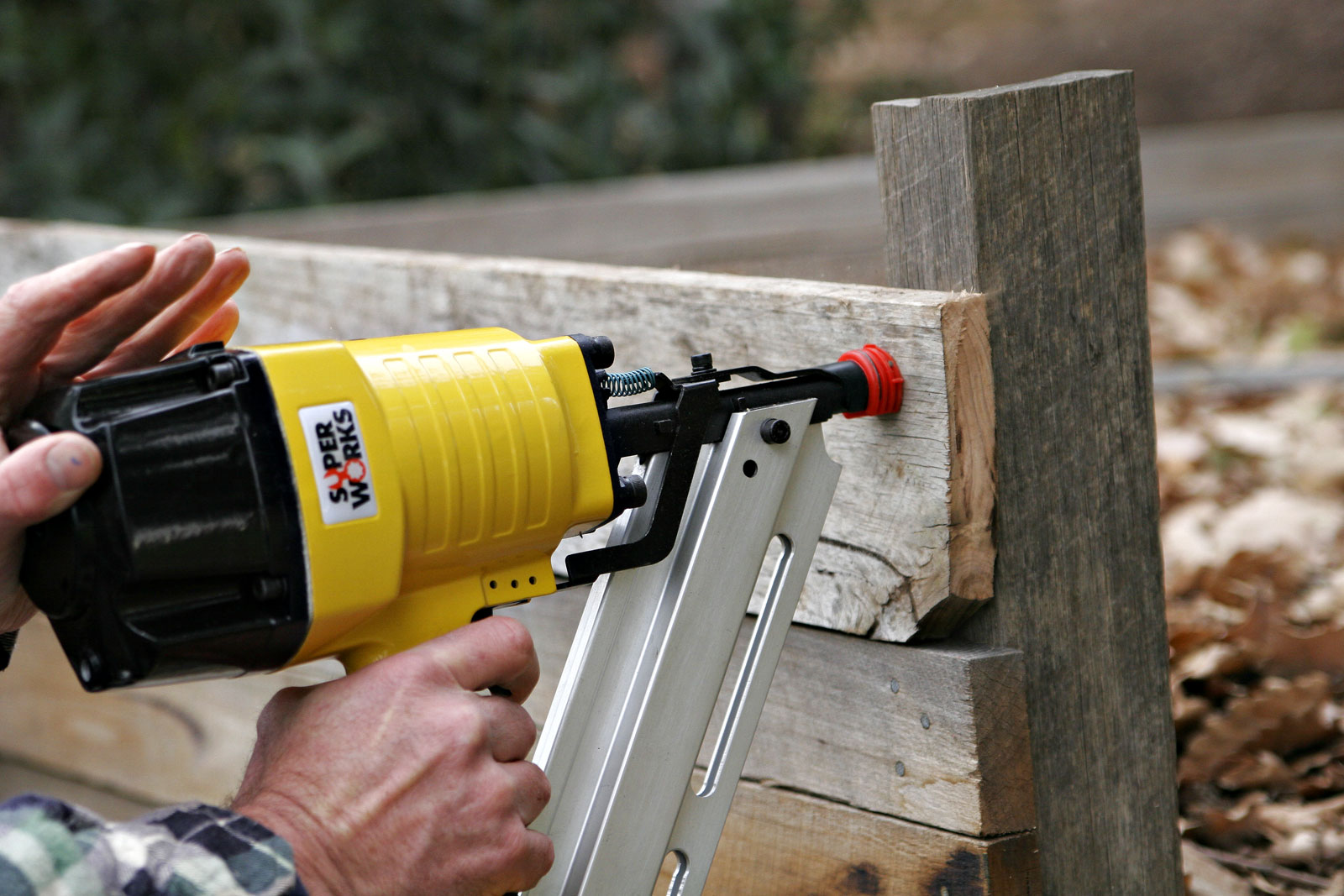
Pneumatic nail gun in use

A nail gun, nailgun or nailer is a form of hammer used to drive nails into wood or other materials. It is usually driven by compressed air (pneumatic), electromagnetism, highly flammable gases such as butane or propane, or, for powder-actuated tools, a small explosive charge. Nail guns have in many ways replaced hammers as tools of choice among builders.

The nail gun was designed by Morris Pynoos, a civil engineer by training, for his work on Howard Hughes' Hughes H-4 Hercules (known as the Spruce Goose). The wooden fuselage was nailed together and glued, and then the nails were removed.

The first nail gun used air pressure and was introduced to the market in 1950 to speed the construction of housing floor sheathing and sub-floors. With the original nail gun, the operator used it while standing and could nail 40 to 60 nails a minute. It had a capacity of 400 to 600 nails.

== Use ==
Nail guns use fasteners mounted in long clips (similar to a stick of staples) or collated in a paper or plastic carrier, depending on the design of the nail gun. Some full head nail guns, especially those used for pallet making and roofing, use long plastic or wire collated coils. Some strip nailers use a clipped head so the nails can be closer together, which allows less frequent reloading. Clip head nails are sometimes banned by state or local building codes. Full Round Head nails and ring shank nails provide greater resistance to pull out. Nailers may also be of the 'coil' type where the fasteners come in wire or plastic collation similar to belt; the advantage is many more fasteners per load, but at the expense of extra weight. Industrial nailers designed for use against steel or concrete may have a self-loading action for the explosive caps, but most need nails to be loaded by hand. Nail guns vary in the length and gauge (thickness) of nails they can drive.

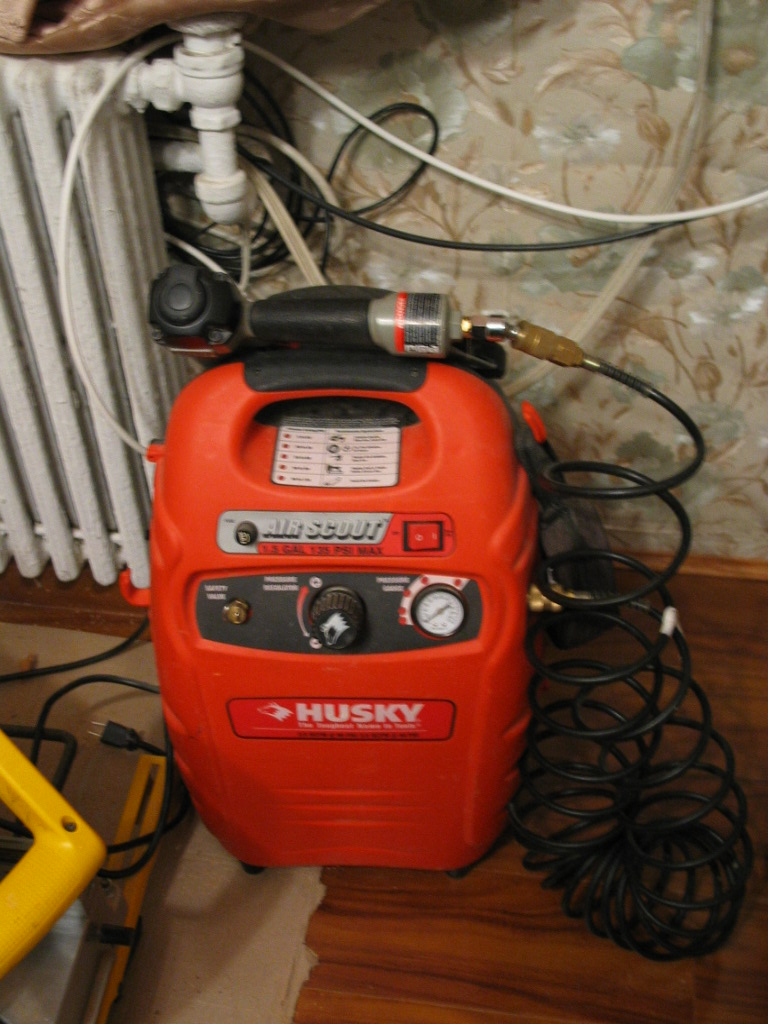
Air compressor supplies air into a nail gun

The smallest size of fasteners are normally 23 gauge (0.025 inches or 0.64 millimetres in diameter), commonly called "pin nailers" and generally have only a minimal head. They are used for attaching everything from beadings, mouldings and so forth to furniture all the way up to medium-sized 7-to-8-inch (18 to 20 cm) baseboard, crown molding and casing. Lengths are normally in the range 3/8 to 1 1/4 inches (10 to 32 mm), although some industrial tool manufacturers supply up to 2 inches (51 mm). The 23 gauge micro pin is rapidly gaining ground as users find that it leaves a much smaller hole than brad nails, thereby eliminating the time normally taken to fill holes and presenting a far better looking finished product.

The next size up is the 18 gauge (1.02 mm diameter) fixing, often referred to as a "brad". These fastenings are also used to fix mouldings but can be used in the same way as the smaller 22 to 24 gauge fastenings. Their greater strength leads to their use in trim carpentry on hardwoods where some hole filling is acceptable. Most 18 gauge brads have heads, but some manufacturers offer headless fastenings. Lengths range from 5/8 to 2 inches (16 to 51 mm).

The next sizes are 16 and 15 gauge (1.63 and 1.83 mm diameter). These are generally referred to as "finish nails". They come in lengths between 5/8 and 2 1/2 in (16 and 64 mm) and are used in the general fixing of much softwood and MDF trim work (such as baseboard/skirtings, architraves, etc.) where the holes will be filled and the work painted afterwards.

The largest sizes of conventional collated fastenings are the clipped head and full head nails which are used in framing, fencing and other forms of structural and exterior work. These nails generally have a shank diameter of 0.11 to 0.13 in (2.8 to 3.3 mm) although some manufacturers offer smaller diameter nails as well. General lengths are in the range 2 to 3 1/3 in (51 to 85 mm). Shank styles include plain, ring annular, twisted, etc. and a variety of materials and finishes are offered including plain steel, galvanized steel, sherardised steel, stainless steel, etc. depending on the pull-out resistance, corrosion resistance, etc. required for the given application. These sizes of fastenings are available in stick collated form (often 20° to 21° for full head, 28° to 34° for clipped head) or coil form (for use in pallet/roofing nailers) depending on the application. Full-head nails have greater pull-out resistance than clipped head nails.

Another type of fastening commonly found in construction is the strap fastening which is roughly analogous to the large head clout nail. These are used in conjunction with a strap shot nailer to fix metalwork such as joist hangers, corner plates, strengthening straps, etc. to timber structures. They differ from conventional nailers in that the point of the fastening is not sheathed so it can be exactly positioned before firing the nail gun.

Other specialist nailers are also available which can drive spikes up to 6 1/4 inches (16 cm) long, fix wood to steel, etc.

A palm nailer is a small, lightweight tool, typically pneumatic, which fits into the palm of one hand. It is convenient for working in tight spaces and can drive both short and long nails. Repeated hammer blows (of around 40 hits per second) rather than a single strike drive the fastener.

== Safety ==
Nail gun safety video

In the United States, about 42,000 people every year go to emergency rooms with injuries from nail guns, according to the U.S. Centers for Disease Control (CDC). 40% of those injuries occur to consumers. Nail gun injuries tripled between 1991 and 2005. Foot and hand injuries are among the most common. The U.S. Consumer Product Safety Commission estimates that treating nail gun wounds costs at least $338 million per year nationally in emergency medical care, rehabilitation, and workers' compensation. Often personnel selling the tools know little about the dangers associated with their use or safety features that can prevent injuries.

Injuries to the fingers, hands, and feet are among the three most common, but there are also injuries that involve other body areas such as arms, legs and eyes as well as internal organs. Some of these injuries are serious and some have resulted in loss of vision and/or death.

All kinds of nail guns can be dangerous, so safety precautions similar to those for a firearm are usually recommended for their use. For safety, nail guns are designed to be used with the muzzle contacting the target. Unless specifically modified for the purpose, they are not effective as a projectile weapon.

The most common firing mechanism is the dual-action contact-trip trigger, which requires that the manual trigger and nose contact element both be depressed for a nail to be discharged. The sequential-trip trigger, which is safer, requires the nose contact to be depressed before the manual trigger, rather than simultaneously with the trigger. Approximately 65% to 69% of injuries from contact-trip tools could be prevented through the use of a sequential-trip trigger, according to the CDC.

There is recoil associated with the discharge of a nail from a nail gun. Contact triggers allow the gun to fire unintended nails if the nose hits the wood surface or a previously placed nail following recoil. Nailers with touch tip (contact) triggers are susceptible to this double firing. According to a 2002 engineering report from the Consumer Products Safety Commission (CPSC), the recoil and firing of the second nail occurs well before the trigger can be released. Acute injury rates are twice as high among users of tools with contact triggers.

In September 2011 The Occupational Safety and Health Administration (OSHA) and the National Institute for Occupational Safety and Health (NIOSH) issued a nail gun safety guide that details practical steps to prevent injuries including use of tools with sequential triggers, training prior to use, and use of appropriate protective equipment such as eye protection. In June 2013, NIOSH released an instructional comic providing information on nail gun hazards and ways to use the device properly.

Research aimed at reducing nail gun accidents among frame carpenters, among the heaviest users of nail guns, continues.

== Types ==
=== Pneumatic ===
The most popular type of nail gun, which uses compressed air to drive its fasteners. Thus, it is dependent on both a compressor and a power source to operate the compressor (either direct electrical current or an on-site generator), and encumbered in use by a cumbersome high-pressure air hose (which may be extremely stiff in cold weather, and retain an annoying "memory" of having been coiled at any time).

A pneumatic nail gun is also limited by the size and rebound rate of its compressor in the number of fasteners it can drive consecutively.

Historically pneumatic air guns required daily oiling (at a minimum), though "oil-free" versions are also produced.

=== Powder-actuated ===
Propellant-powered ("powder-actuated") nail guns fall into two broad categories:

1. Direct drive or high velocity devices. This uses gas pressure acting directly on the nail to drive it.
2. Indirect drive or low velocity devices. This uses gas pressure acting on a heavy piston which drives the nail. Indirect drive nailers are safer because they cannot launch a free-flying projectile even if tampered with or misused, and the lower velocity of the nails is less likely to cause explosive shattering of the work substrate.

Either type can, with the right cartridge loads, be very powerful, driving a nail or other fastener into hard concrete, stone, hardwood, steel, etc., with ease.

=== Combustion powered ===
Powered by a gas (e.g. propane) and air explosion in a small cylinder; the piston pushes the nail directly and there are no rotating parts.

=== Electric powered ===
An electric nail gun uses electricity to power a motor, which is when a piston shoots the nail into any material, typically wood or another soft material since the electric powered nail gun tends to be less powerful than an air compressed. The electric motor then compresses the air inside the piston which forces the nail out the end of the nail gun into the material. This allows a much quicker and more efficient way to drive nails than manual methods such as a hammer and nail. One of the benefits of using an electric nail gun is to reduce the physical effort and time required for large-scale tasks.

Electric nail guns are commonly used in construction and woodworking for framing smaller items such as baseboard installation, and securing trim.

There are two main styles of electric nail guns, corded and battery-powered nail guns. Corded relies on an electrical outlet for power and requires a cord to extend from the nail gun to the wall; battery-style nail guns offer increased mobility and easy use when needed. While electric nail guns provide advantages such as ease of use and quiet operation, they do have limitations like power dependency, battery life and increased weight, especially with higher capacity battery packs.

=== Solenoid powered ===
A solenoid nail gun works differently than a pneumatic nail gun. Instead of using compressed air to shoot nails, it relies on an electromagnetic solenoid shoot the nail into the product. This means it uses electricity as its power source, which is different from pneumatic nail guns. For safety, they come with features like trigger locks and safety tips to stop any accidental firing. These nailers are suitable for smaller and more precise tasks, like installing cabinetry or working on trim, because they deliver less recoil and are better for finishing work on sensitive materials. They handle 18-gauge brad nails ranging from 1/2 to 2 inches (13 to 51 mm) long. Some of them use a depth adjustment feature, which lets the operator adjust how deep the nail goes into the wood and the pressure applied. A solenoid nail gun does not require oil like regular pneumatic ones, although regular upkeep, like cleaning, is needed to ensure that everything operates correctly.

=== Pin nailer ===
A pin nailer is a type of nail gun that drives simple pin-like fasteners as substitutes for finish nails.

Pin nailers are often used on molding for furniture, cabinets, and interior millwork. They can also work as temporary fasteners for pieces with irregular shapes that are impossible to hold down with a clamp securely.

== Gallery ==
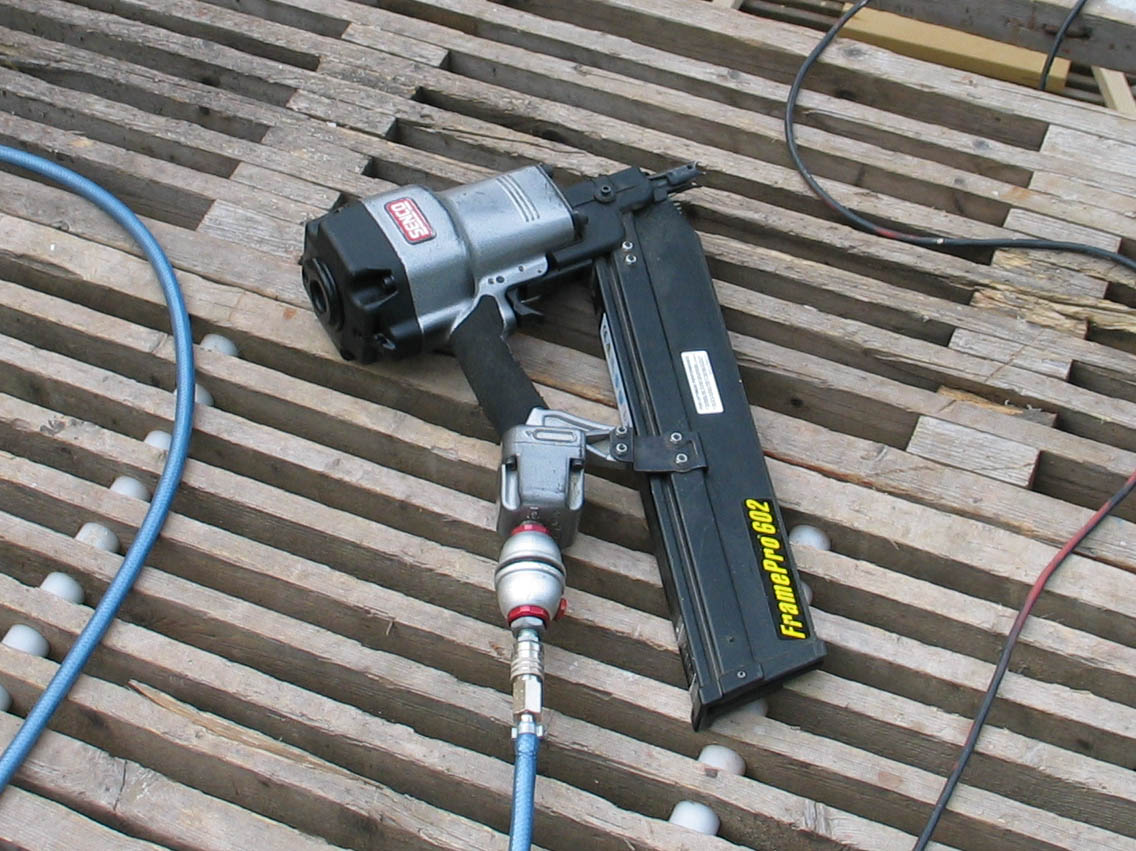
Pneumatic nail guns require hoses for their compressed air power supply

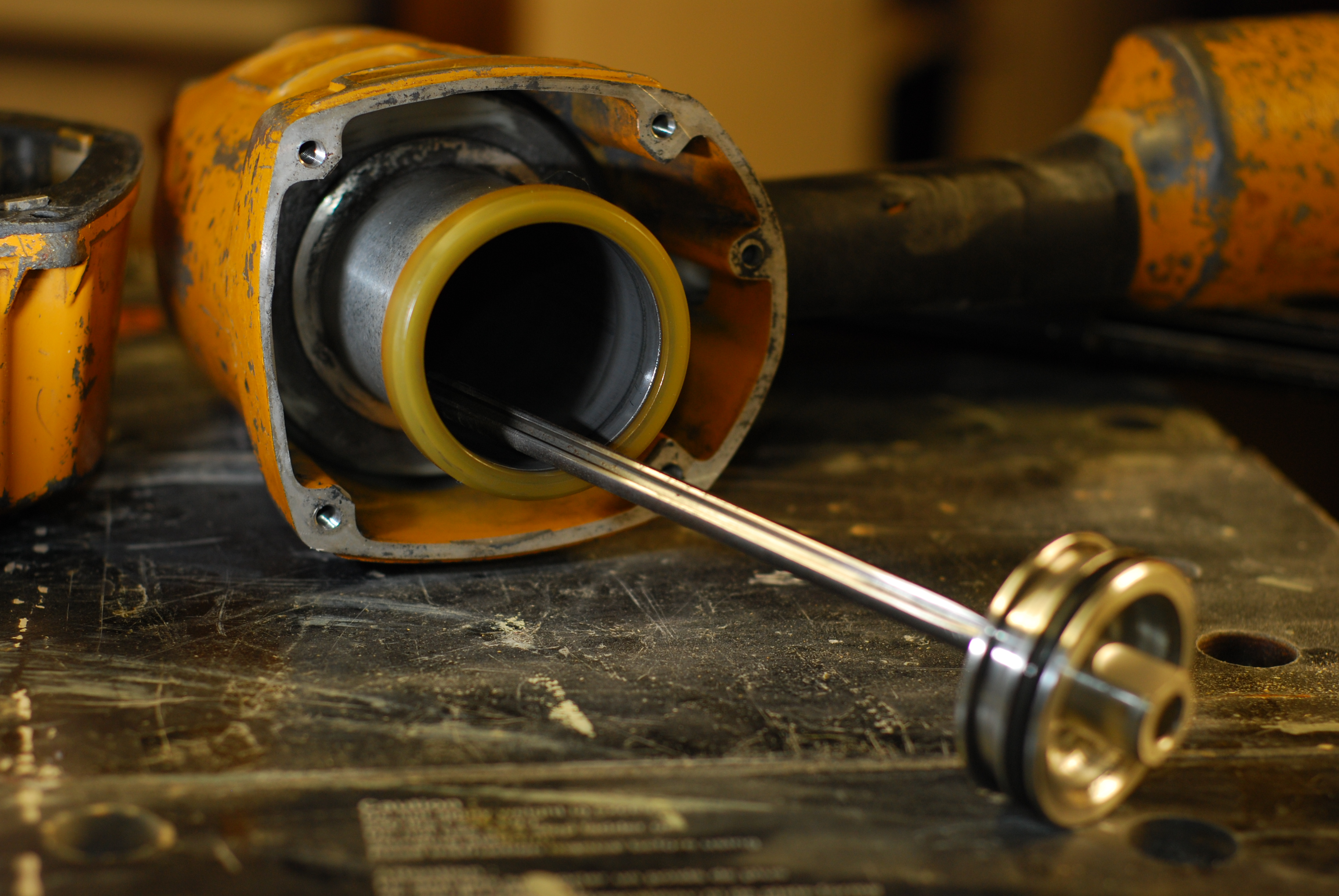
A piston in the head of a nail gun drives the fastener

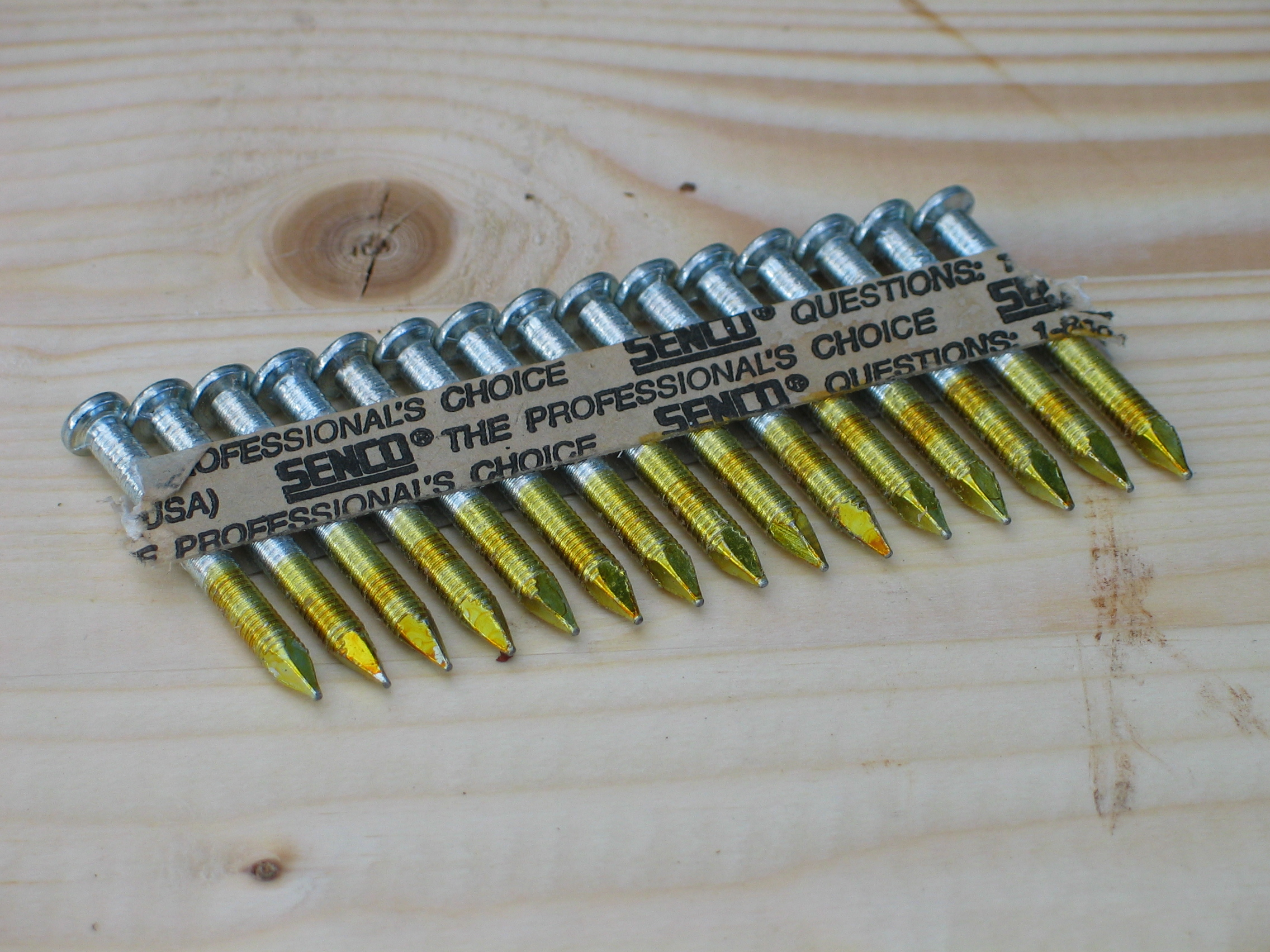
Nails are ganged into "clips" by paper, plastic, and fine welded wire

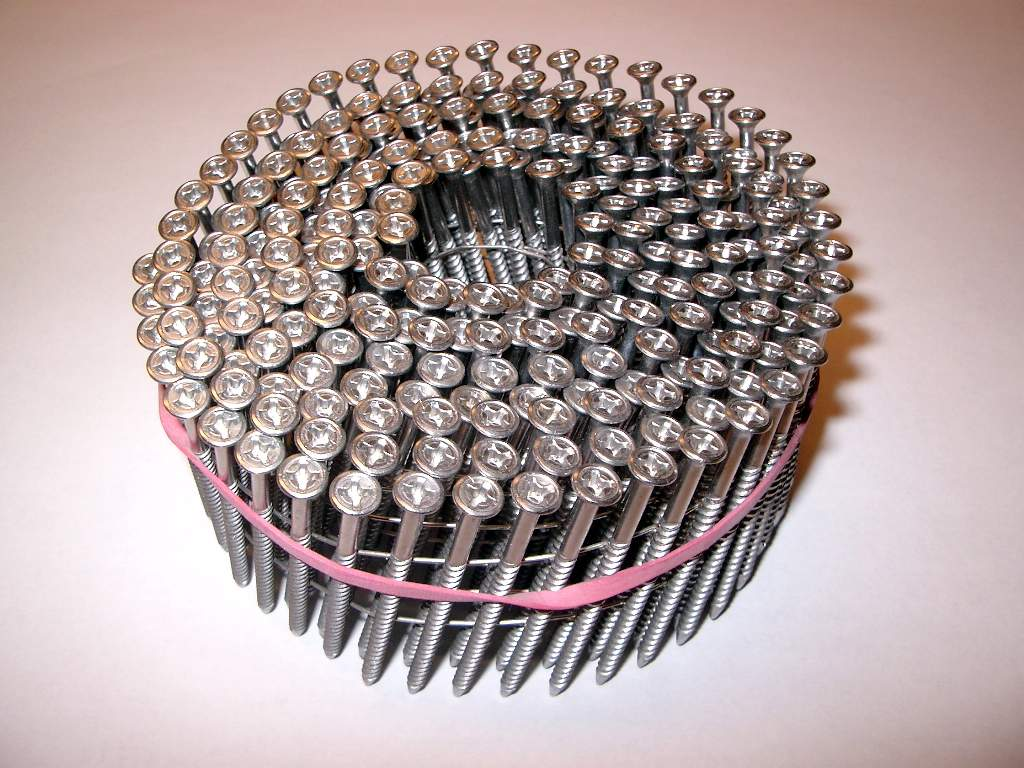
Nails come in coils for "coil nailers"

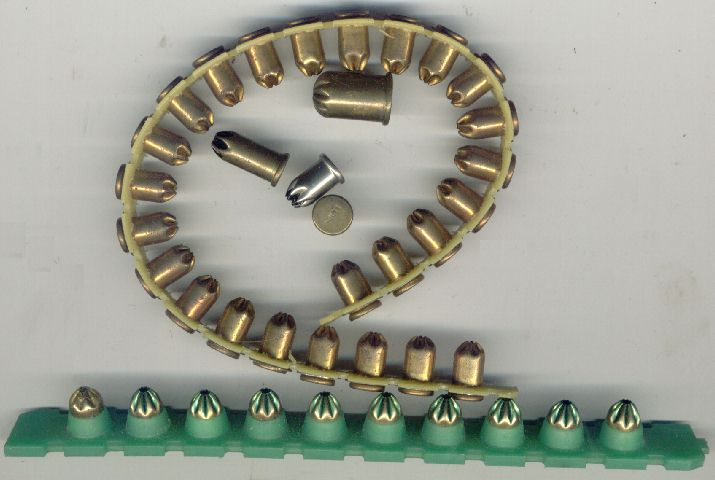
Cartridges are used in powder actuated nail guns

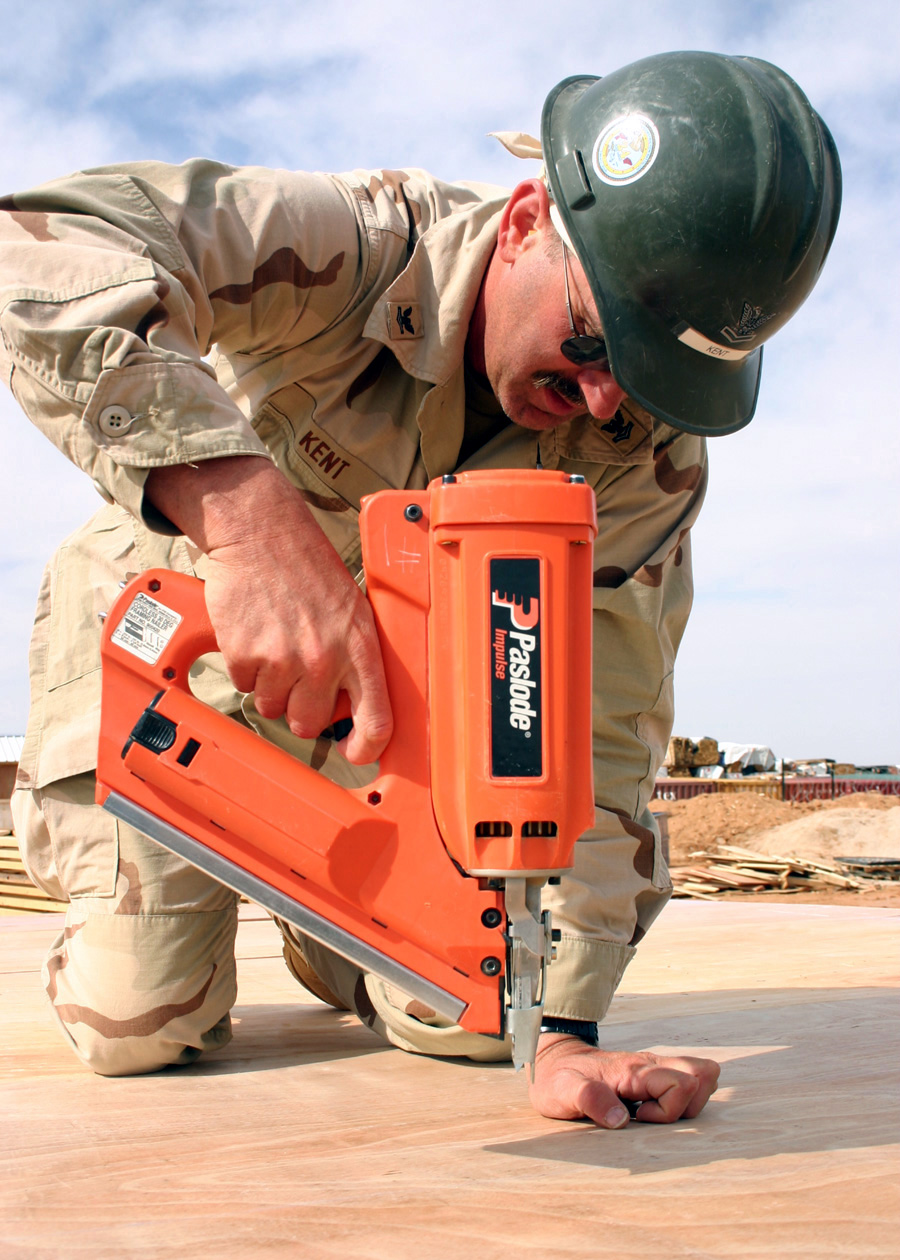
Combustible fuel and an electric igniter power many cordless nail guns

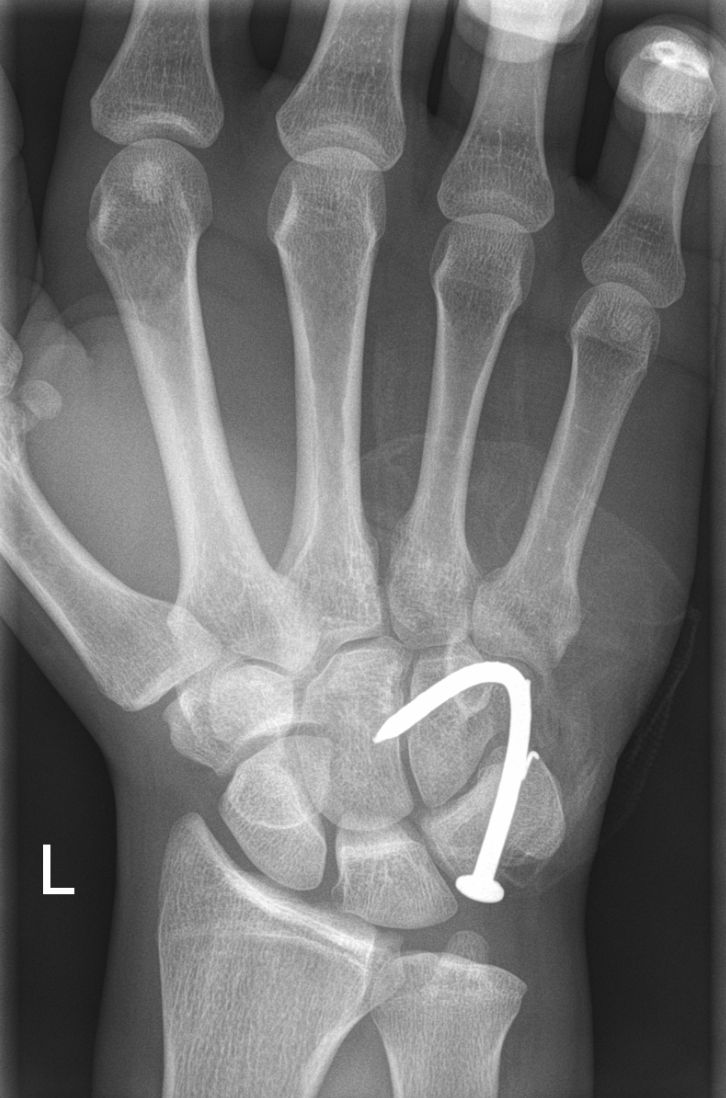
Nail gun injuries are common, and may lead to disability or death

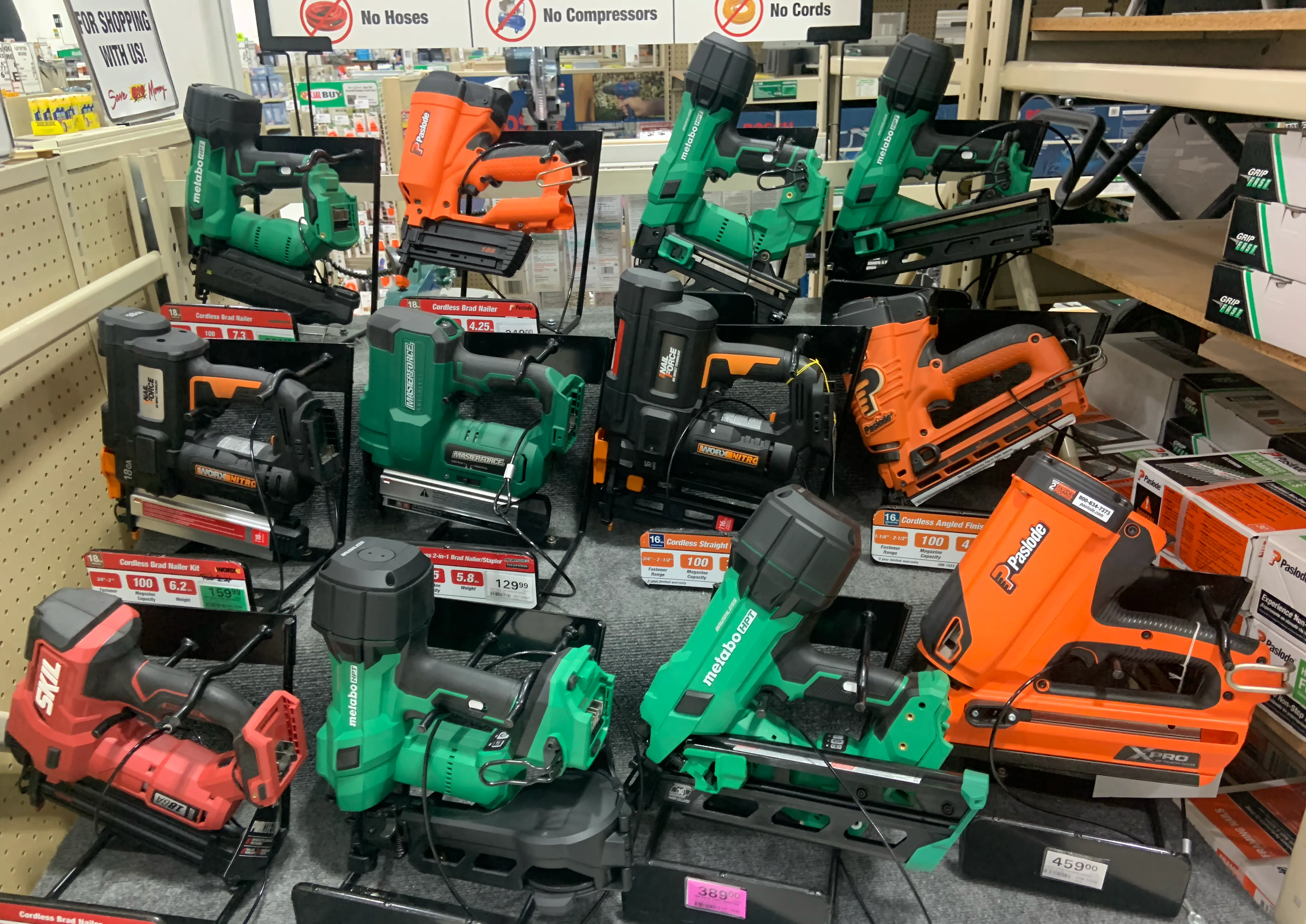
Cordless nail guns

== See also ==
- Air compressor
- Needlegun scaler
- Paslode Impulse, a trademarked name for a cordless nail gun powered by a small flammable gas explosion
- Screw gun
- Staple gun
