= Miter square =

Hand tool used for marking and checking angles

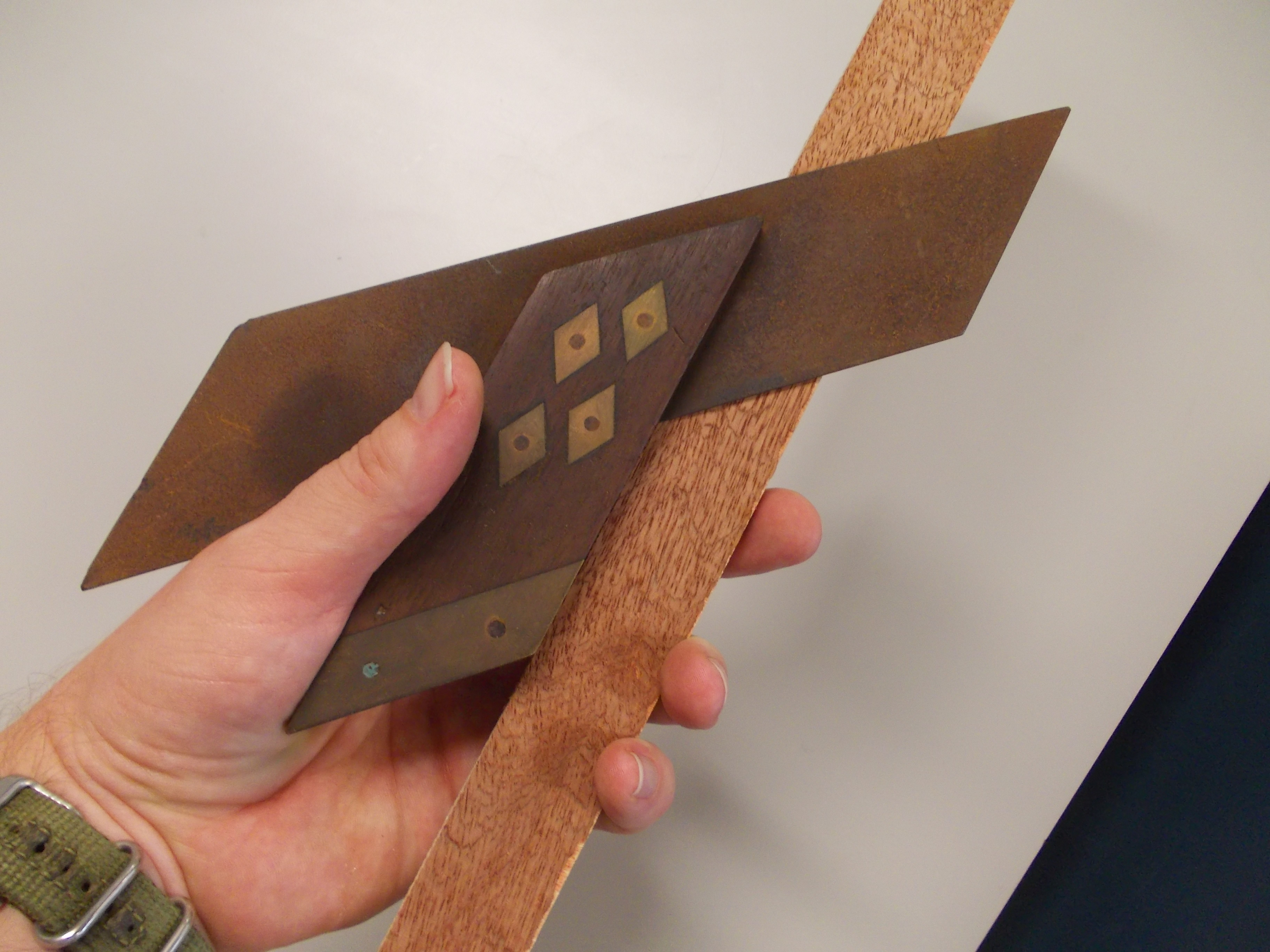
- A mitre square with a wooden stock, a steel blade, and brass rivets
- Other names: Mitre square
- Classification: Hand tool; Square (tool)
- Used with: Pens, pencils, marking knives
- Related: Square (tool)

A miter square or mitre square is a hand tool used in woodworking and metalworking for marking and checking angles other than 90°. Most miter squares are for marking and checking 45° angles and its supplementary angle, 135°.

A miter is a bevelled edge – usually 45° – used, for example, for making miter joints for woodworking. Squares are tools designed for marking and checking specific fixed angles, usually 90° or 45°, though most squares are exclusively for working with 90° angles.

== Description ==
As with 90° squares, there are many different types of miter square. Miter squares are usually made from two fixed parts, a stock and a blade (sometimes called a tongue).

The blade on a modern factory-made miter square is typically a thin piece of metal which is fixed at 45° onto or into the stock, forming a 'T' shape. The stock is usually much thicker than the blade and is made from wood, metal or plastic. Until the development of factory-made squares in the 18th century miter squares were made entirely from wood, though some woodworkers still make themselves wooden miter squares.

Other forms of miter square include the dovetail square, with the blade set at an angle suited to marking out dovetail joints, and the Japanese miter square, a flat piece of metal with a thin metal stock along one edge – similar in construction to a speed square.

Some other types of square incorporate miter squares, such as combination squares, speed squares, and try squares with a mitered stock.

== Examples ==
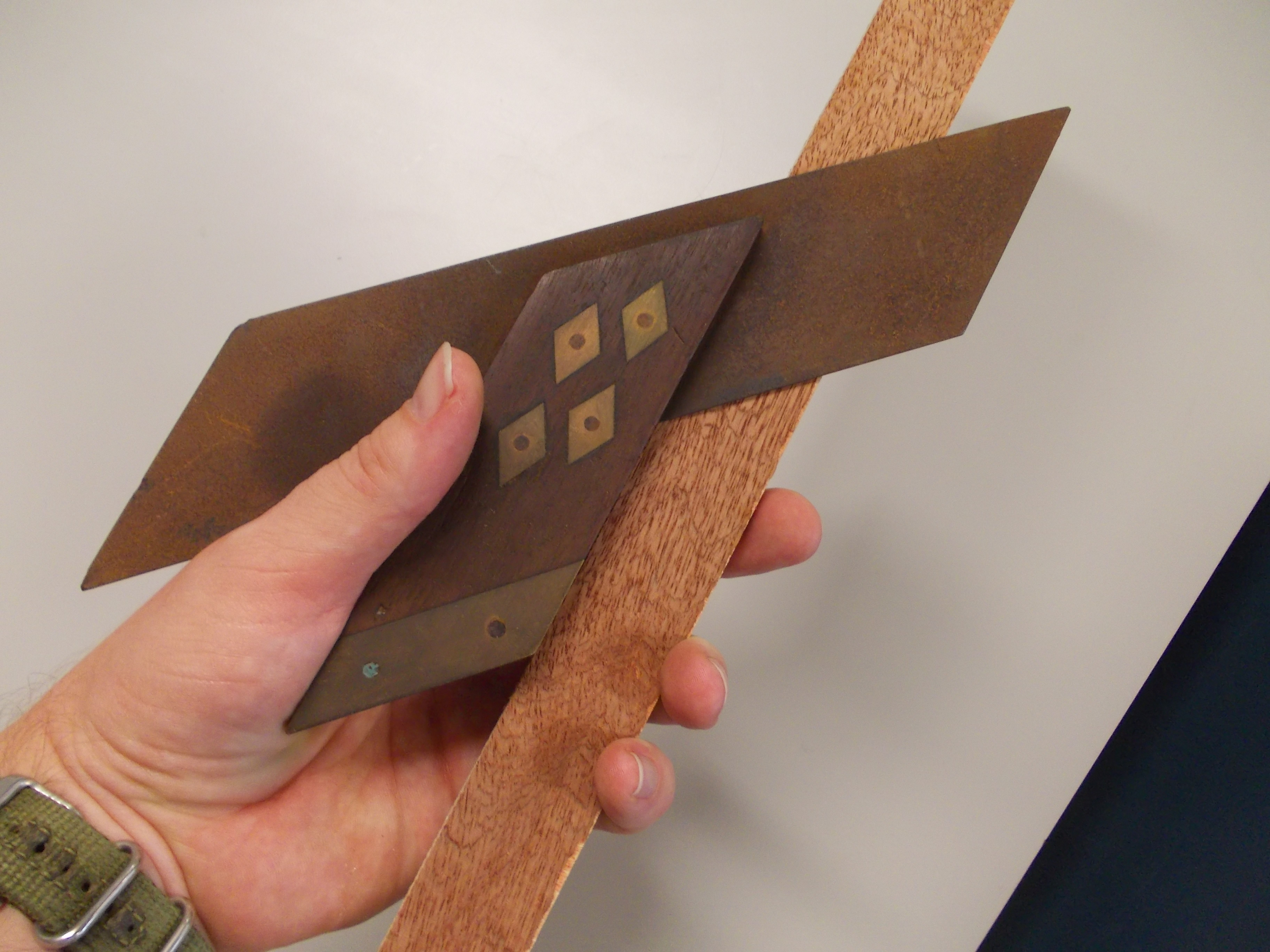
Square with a wooden stock, a steel blade, and brass rivets

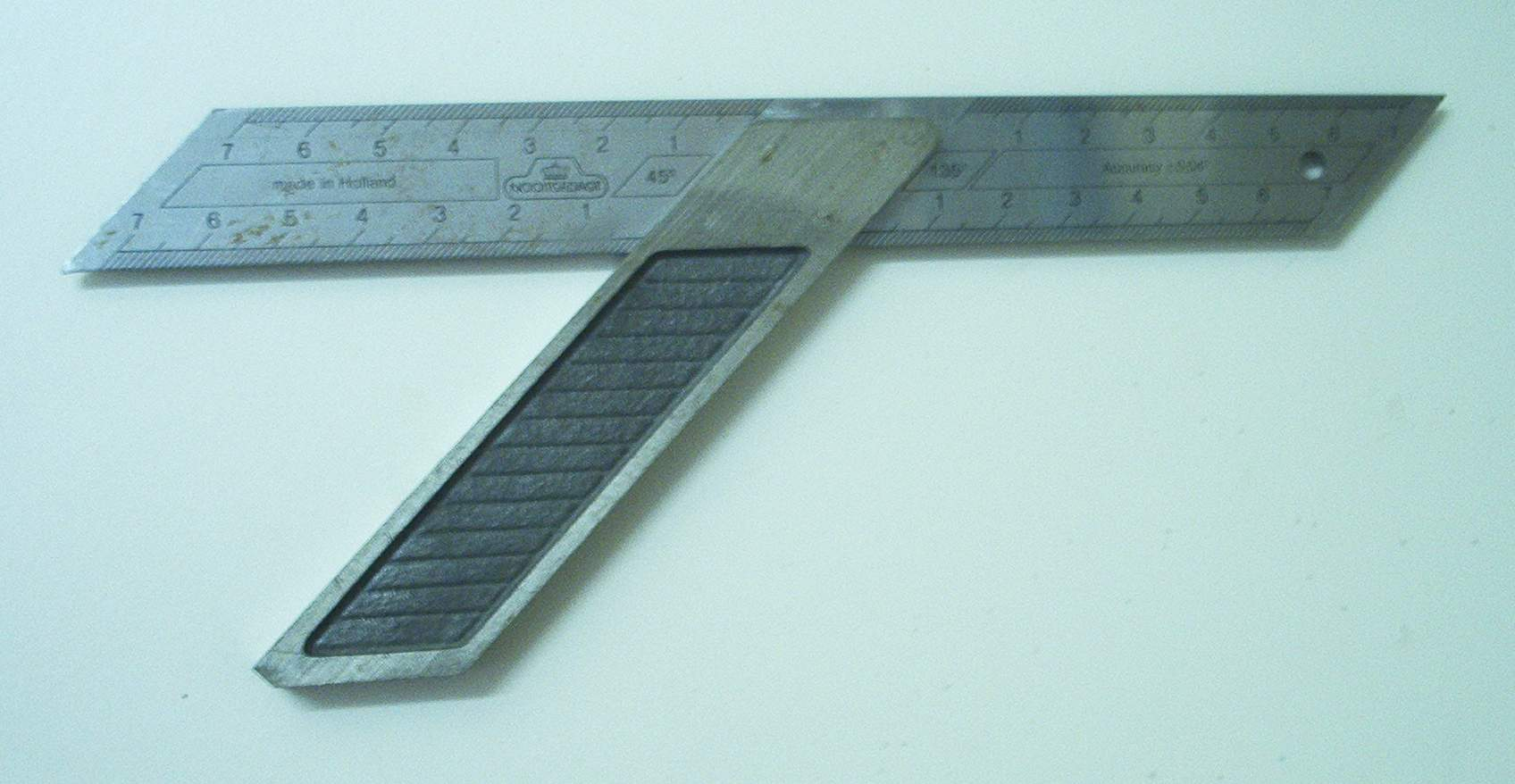
A metal miter square

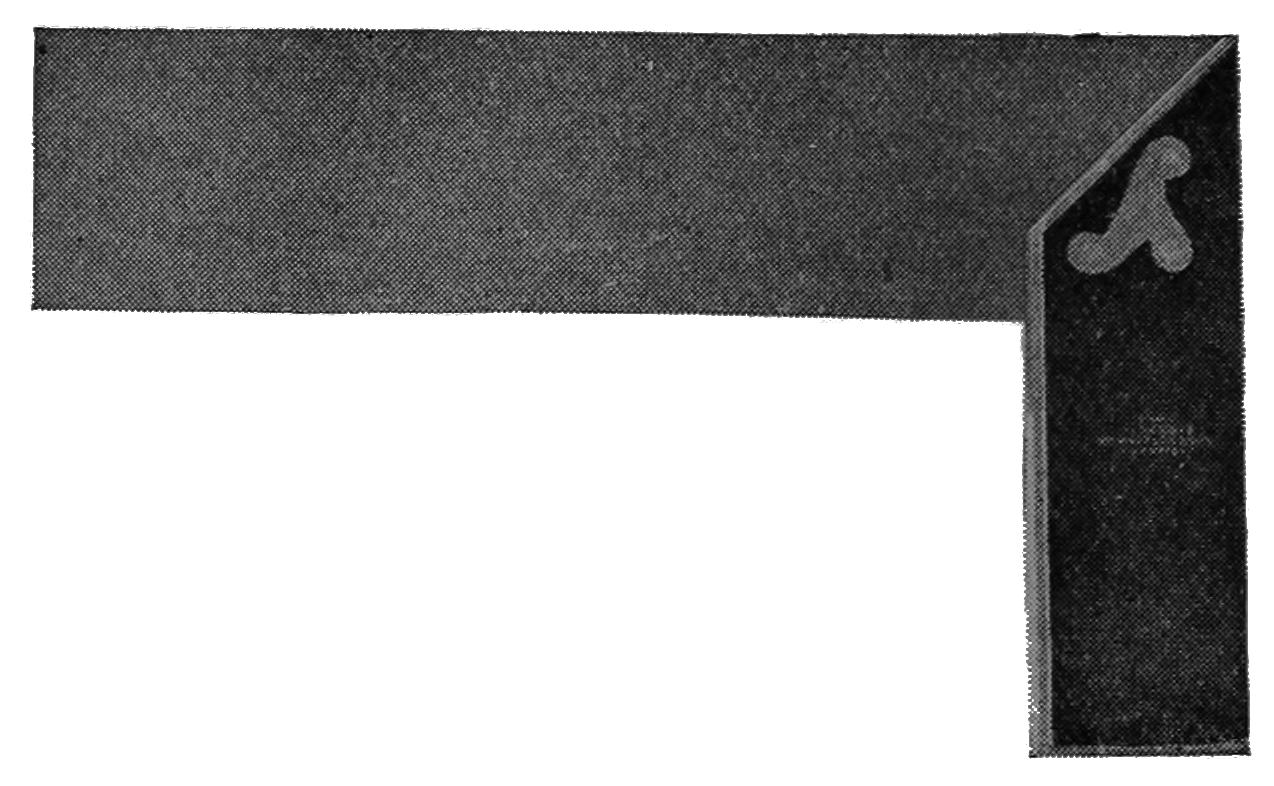
A try square with a miterd stock

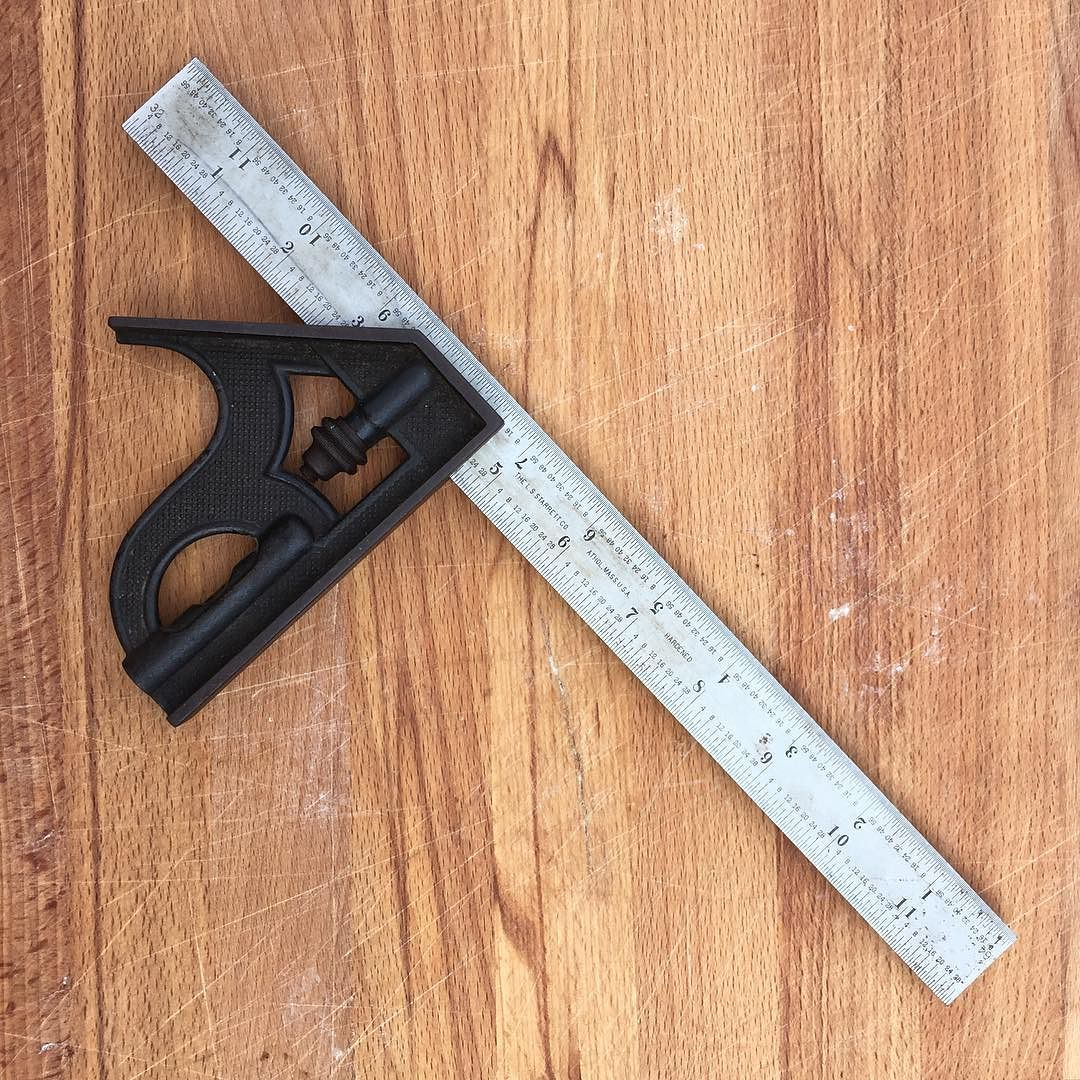
Combination squares incorporate a miter square

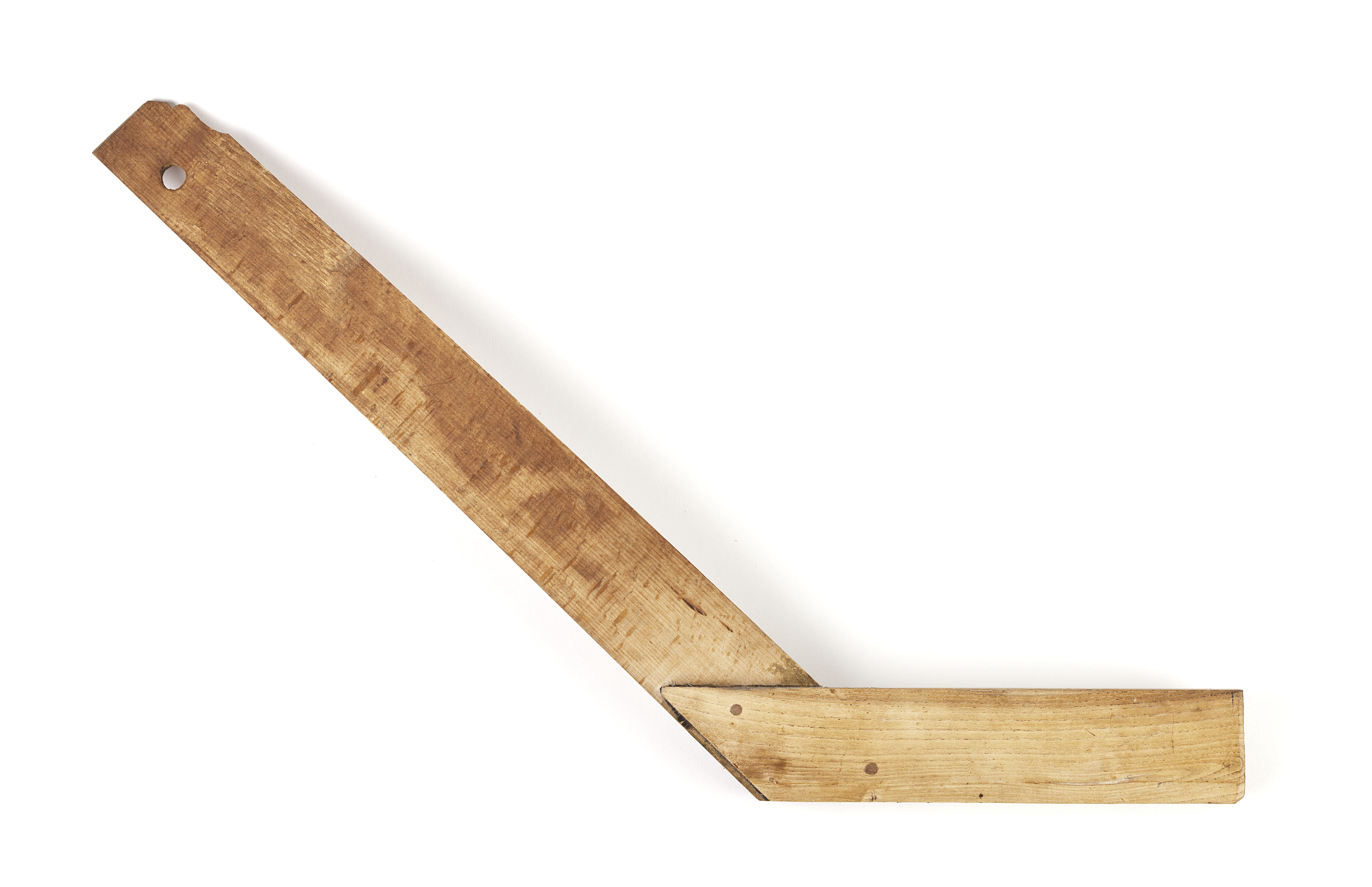
A square similar in design to historic wooden try squares

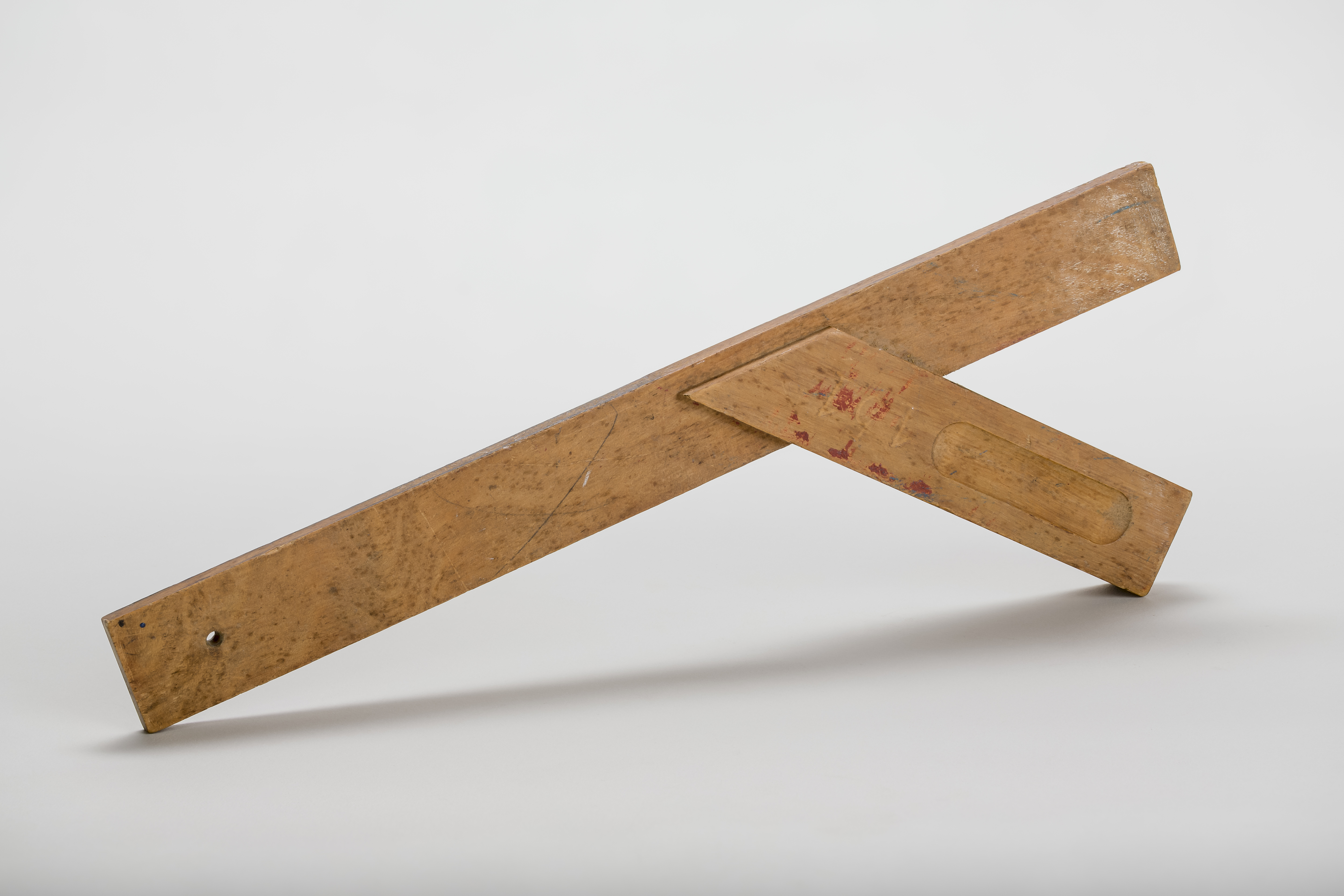
Square made from beech

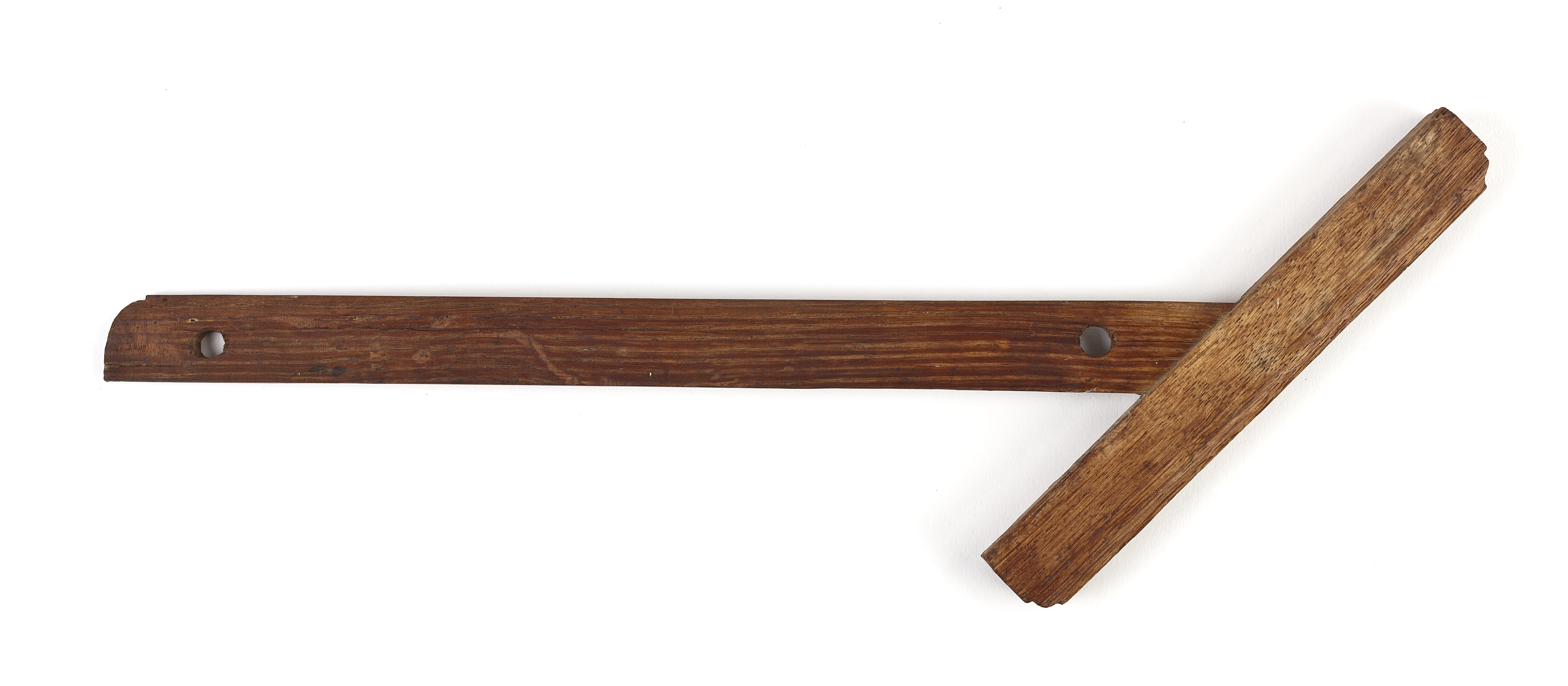
A mitered T-square

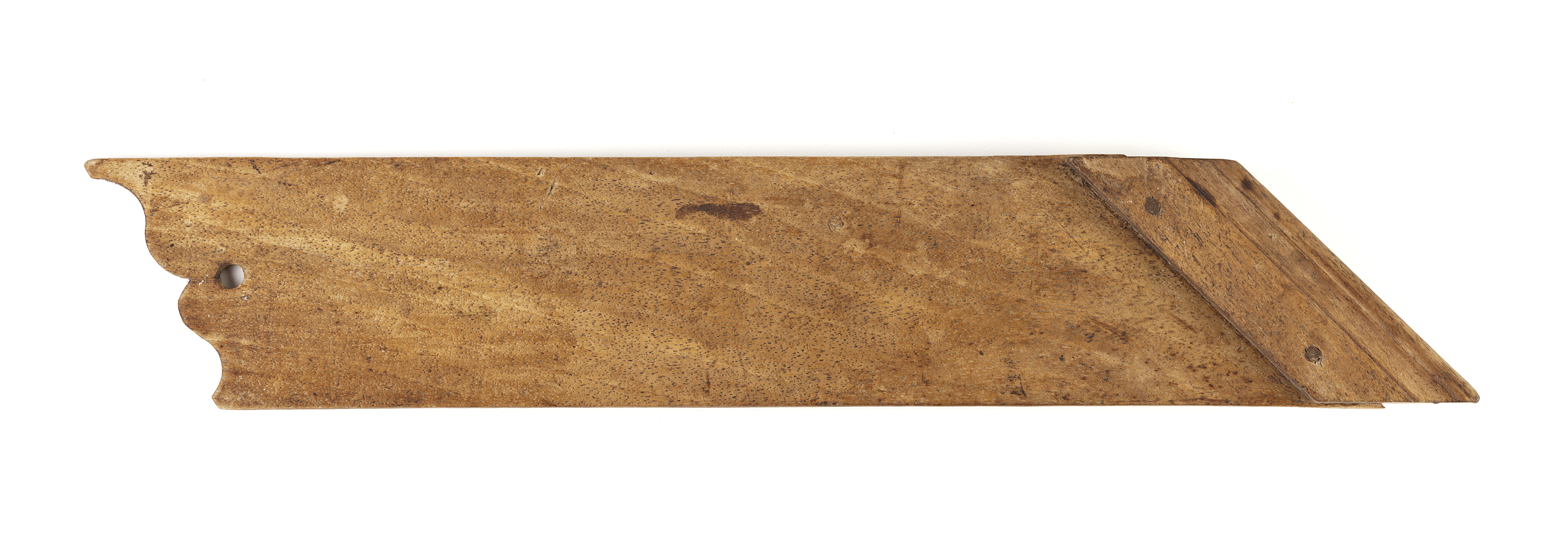
A miter bevel
