= Bing's circular square =

Tool for approximate circle-squaring

Bing's circular square

Bing's circular square, named after Edward Bing, is a set square with the legs at the right angle being in a 44:23 ratio. It can be used for a simple approximative squaring of the circle.

== Squaring of the circle ==
Squaring of the circle

Pick an arbitrary point $P$ on the circle. Then place the set square in such a way that the vertex at its smallest angle lies on $P$ and its longest side (hypotenuse) goes through the circle's center, that is it lies on a diameter of the circle. Now the other leg on the angle in $P$ intersects the circle in a second point $Q$ and the segment $PQ$ is the side of a square with approximately the same area as the circle.

The area of the square constructed in this way can be calculated from the Pythagorean theorem as
$$\frac{44^2}{44^2+23^2}(2r)^2=\frac{7744}{2465}r^2\approx 3.14158r^2.$$
The approximation to π used in this formula, $7744/2465$, is smaller than $\pi$ by approximately 0.00033%, and the same approximation quality holds for the area of the constructed square.

== Derivation ==
The sharp angle $\alpha$ of a right triangle that would square the circle exactly can be calculated as
$$\alpha=\cos^{-1}\frac{\sqrt\pi}{2}\approx 27.597^\circ.$$
For this angle, the side of the square would be
$$2r\cos\alpha=r\sqrt\pi.$$
The two side lengths of Bing's circular square are the numerator and denominator of a rational-number approximation to the tangent of $\alpha$, obtained by truncating the continued fraction for
$$\tan\alpha=\sqrt{\frac{4-\pi}{\pi}}.$$
The continued fraction is
$$\tan\alpha=0+\frac{1}{\displaystyle 1+\frac{1}{\displaystyle 1+\frac{1}{\displaystyle 10+\frac{1}{\displaystyle 1+\frac{1}{\displaystyle 1+\frac{1}{126+\cdots}}}}}},$$
and the sequence of rational approximations obtained by truncating it is:
$$\frac01, \frac11, \frac12,
\frac{11}{21}, \frac{12}{23}, \mathbf{\frac{23}{44}},
\frac{2910}{5567}, \dots$$
Truncating just before the unusually large term 126 in the continued fraction, where the numerators and denominators of the rational approximations make a sudden jump, produces a particularly accurate rational approximation.

== History ==
The set square was devised by the Russian Edward Bing, who was the technical director of the Waggon Works in Riga. Three examples of the set square were part of an exhibition at the Science Museum in London in 1876, one made out of metal and two out of wood.

In 1877 Bing published an article on his set square in the German engineering journal Zeitschrift des Vereines deutscher Ingenieure under the title Der Kreiswinkel. The German name for his set square was derived from this and at the end of the 19th century it was manufactured out of ebonite in four different sizes by the German company Karl Schleicher und Schüll in Düren.

The idea of determining the angle $\alpha$ and potentially constructing a set square based on it occurred several times independently in literature. Aside from Bing's article in a German journal there were also articles in Nature in 1914 and 1918 and in The Mathematical Gazette in 1961.
