= Square (tool) =

Handtools for marking and checking 90° and 45° angles

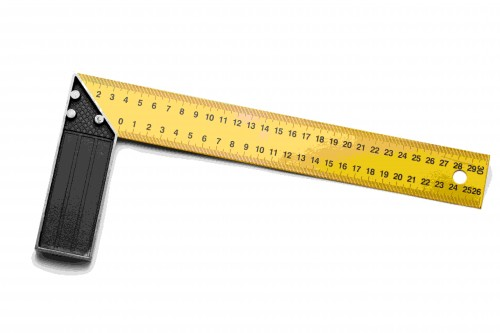
- Classification: Marking and measuring hand tools
- Types: Combination square Framing square Engineer's square Mitre square Set square Speed square Try square T-square
- Used with: Pens, pencils, scribes, drawing boards, and plum bobs

A square is a tool used for marking and referencing a 90° angle, though mitre squares are used for 45° angles. Squares see common use in woodworking, metalworking, construction and technical drawing. Some squares incorporate a scale for measuring distances (a ruler) or for calculating angles.

== Terminology ==
Many squares are made of two parts, a stock and a straight blade or tongue. The stock is usually thicker than the blade, with the blade being fixed into or onto the stock. The blade typically has parallel edges. The stock is usually held against the edge of a workpiece or drawing board and the tongue is then used as a straight edge for making a mark, or as a reference to check the accuracy of an angle.

== History ==
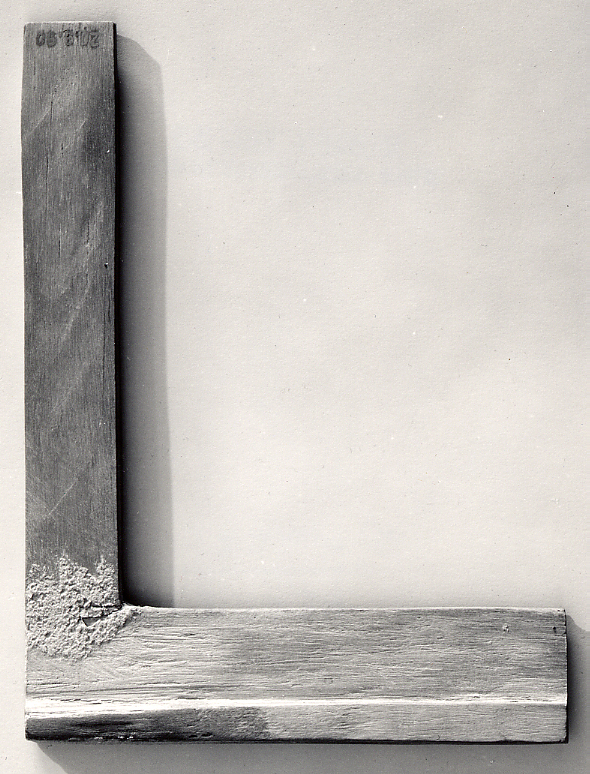
Ancient Egyptian wooden try square from the 20th century BC.

Wooden try squares have survived from Ancient Egypt and Ancient Rome and can be seen in art from the time. From the 18th century squares began to be manufactured in factories, prior to that they were typically made from wood and were often made by the tradesmen themselves. Some woodworkers continue to make their own squares.

== Types of square ==
There are a number of different types of square used for a variety of different industries and purposes:

Names	Image	Description and use
Centre square, or centre finder, or radial square		Designed for marking the centre of round materials, such as dowels in woodworking. The most common form consists of an L-shaped stock with the blade fixed on top bisecting the stock. Another type is made from a single piece of metal with two perpendicular pins which are placed against the edge of the workpiece. Centre squares are also manufactured to be used as a head for a combination square.
Combination square, or sliding square		A combination square features a ruler (the blade) which can be slid and adjusted within a head (the stock). The head usually has one face at 90° to the ruler, and another face at 45° to the ruler. Originally designed for machinists, the tool is also commonly used in woodworking. They can also be purchased with centre finder heads and protractor heads and often incorporate a spirit level.
Cylindrical square, or cylinder square		A cylinder square is a heavy solid steel cylinder used in metalworking that has been machined to a high degree of accuracy, with the ends perpendicular to the axis of the cylinder. By placing it upright on a known flat surface, such as a surface plate it can be used for checking the accuracy of other items, such as engineer's squares.
Engineer's square, or machinist square		An engineer's square is the metalworkers' equivalent of a try square. It consists of a steel blade inserted and either welded or pinned into a heavier and thicker steel stock at a 90° angle.
English layout square		An historic A-shaped woodworking square, which can also be combined with a plumb bob for marking out angles.
Framing square, or steel square, or carpenter's square, or roofing square		Originally designed for timber framing, a framing square is made from a single flat piece of metal or polymer to a standardised design with a long, wide blade and at 90° to a shorter, narrower tongue. It can also be used for measuring lengths and for calculating angles.
L-square		L-square is a generic term used for L-shaped squares, including framing squares, engineer's squares, and try squares. The shorter edge usually being the stock, and the longer edge the blade.
Melencolia try square		An historic style of woodworking square, in which the width of the blade matches the length of the stock. Has seen renewed interest in recent years by some woodworkers.
Mitre bevel		A mitre bevel is an historic mitre square of a similar design to the Melencolia try square.
Mitre square		A mitre square is used in woodworking to mark and measure 45° angles and its supplementary angle, 135°. The most common type (pictured) has a tongue set at 45° to the stock. Factory-made mitre squares usually have a metal tongue and a wooden stock, though historically woodworkers would often make their own out of wood. Despite being named a square, most mitre squares are not used for marking or checking a 90° edge.
Odd Jobs		A multifunctional tool originally manufactured by Stanley that incorporates both a try square and a mitre square.
Plumb square		A square incorporating a plumb bob to check if something is level, and for making horizontal markings.
Positioning square, or clamping square, or assembly square		An L-shaped square used in woodworking for checking an inside or outside angle when assembling workpieces, such as boxes. They are designed to be rigid enough to be clamped in place.
Set square, or triangle		A set square is used in technical drawing, providing a straightedge at a right angle or another particular planar angle to a baseline. They are commonly made from clear plastic. The most common set squares are 45° squares, (one 90° corner and two 45° corners) and 60/30 triangles (a 90°, a 60° and a 30° corner). Another type of set square is an adjustable square, which features an edge that can be adjusted to any angle from 0° to 90°.
Speed square, or rafter square, or rafter angle square, or triangle square, or layout square		A speed square is a triangular carpenters square combining functions of the combination square, try square, and framing square into one. It can be used to calculate and mark angles, to suspend a plumb bob, and as a fence for a circular saw.
Try square, or joiner's square		A try square is the woodworking equivalent of an engineer's square. Made with a thin steel blade fixed at 90° into a thicker stock that is typically made of wood. The inside face of the stock is sometimes faced with brass to reduce wear. Historically woodworkers would often make their own try squares out of wood. The top of the stock is sometimes at a 45° angle so the square can also be used as a mitre square.
T-square, or glazier's square, or drywall square		A T-square is a style of square where the blade is fixed onto or into the middle of the stock, forming a 'T' shape. The most common type of T-square is a guide for drawing horizontal lines on a drawing board, and can guide a set square to draw vertical or diagonal lines. Other types of T-square are used by woodworkers and glaziers for marking up sheet materials such as plywood, glass, and plasterboard.

== Accuracy ==
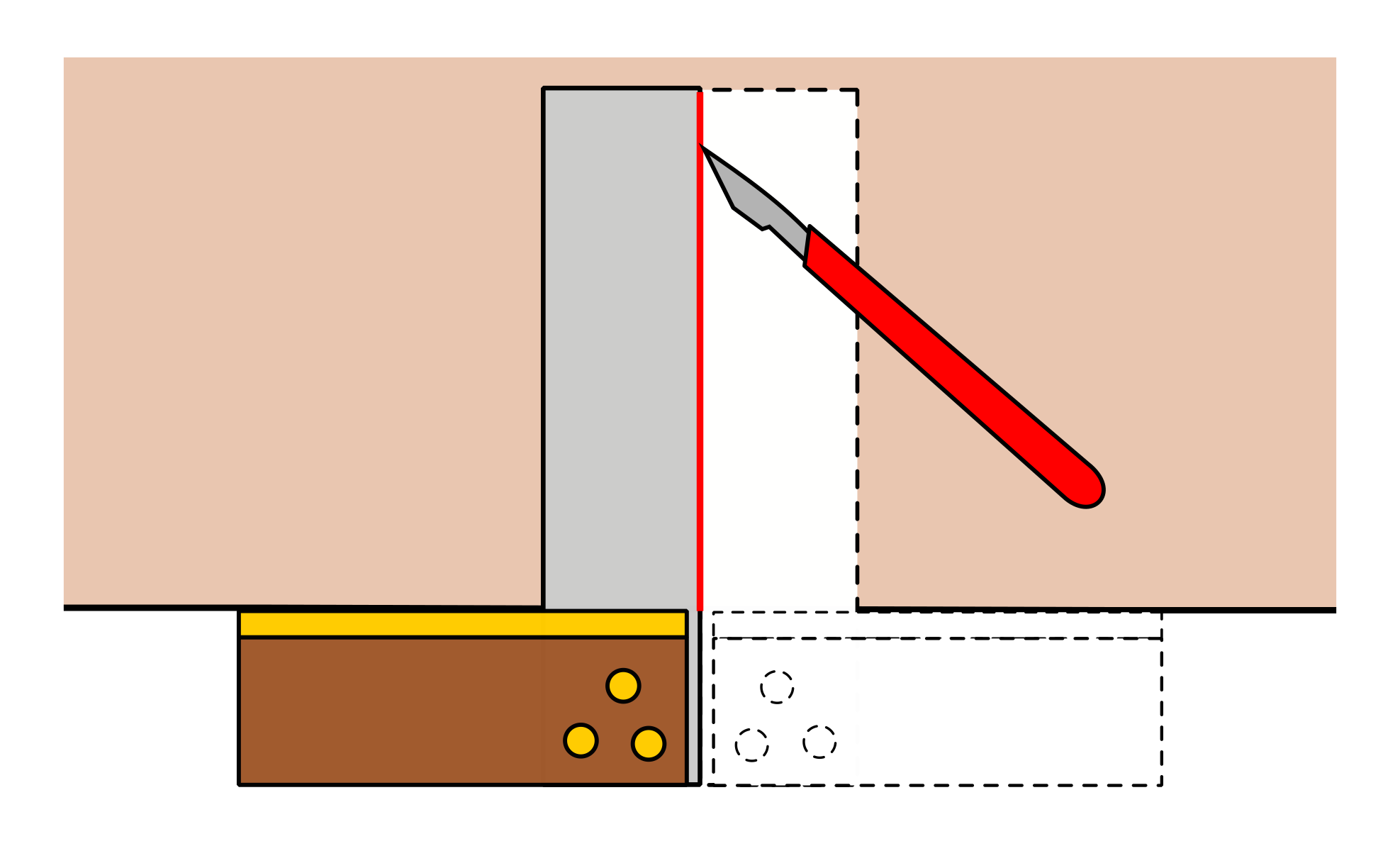
Checking a try square for accuracy against itself.

Different industries and applications have different requirements for the accuracy of squares. Some squares are manufactured to meet regulated standards of accuracy, such as British Standards BS 939:2007 for engineering squares, and BS 3322 for try squares.

A square can become inaccurate over time through common use and abuse, such as the edges becoming worn or the square being dropped or mistreated. The materials, most notably wood, can also vary with changes in temperature and humidity. Squares can be checked for accuracy against a known reference, such as a square or piece of machinery that is known to be accurate or against a cylindrical square. A bright light or feeler gauges can be used to check for gaps between the square and the object being referenced.

Through symmetry, squares can also be checked against themselves. One method for L-shaped squares (illustrated) is to hold the square against a reliable known straight edge. A line is struck using a marking knife or sharp pencil; the square is then flipped over, and from the same point another line is struck. If the square is accurate, only a single line should be visible.

There are a number of methods for correcting an inaccurate square by hand. For example, wooden blades can be corrected using a hand plane and sandpaper, while metal blades can be corrected using a file, emery cloth, or sandpaper. Framing squares can be adjusted using a hammer and a punch.

== Symbolism ==
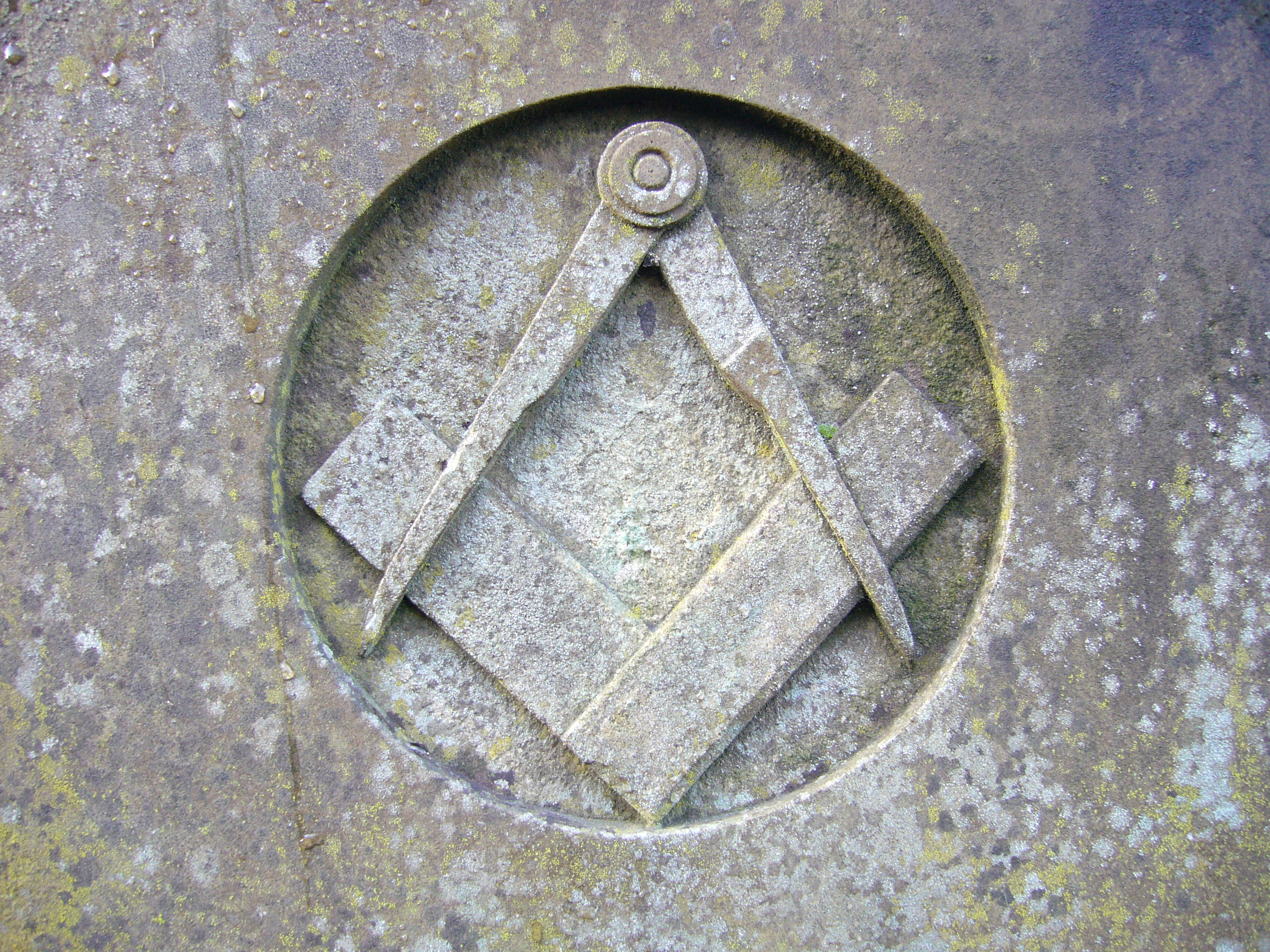
The square and compass symbol used by Freemasons.

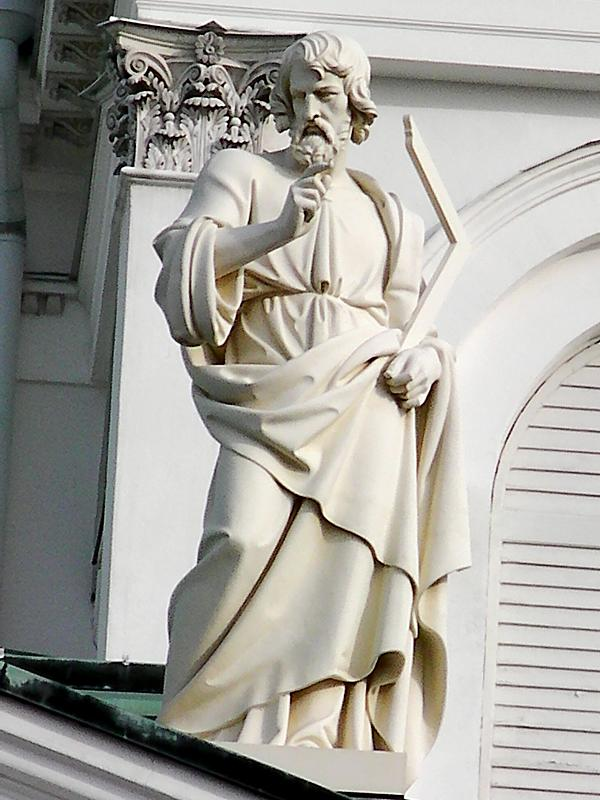
Statue in Helsinki of Thomas the Apostle holding a square.

The square is incorporated into the most common Freemasonry symbol, the Square and Compasses. Historically squares have also been used by woodworkers, such as joiners and carpenters, as symbols in signs and heraldry to represent their trade. The square as a symbol is also seen in artistic representations of the Christian saints Thomas the Apostle and James the Less.
