= Scratch awl =

Woodworking tool for layout and point marking

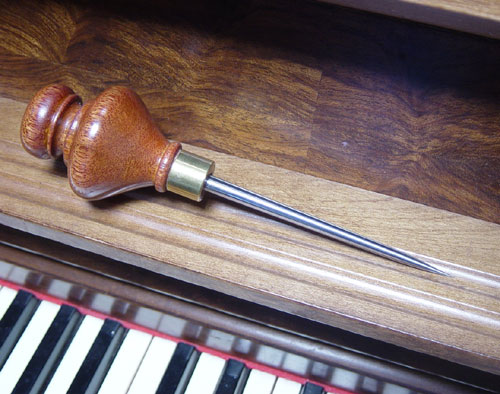
Scratch awl

A scratch awl is a woodworking layout and point-making tool. It is used to scribe a line to be followed by a hand saw or chisel when making woodworking joints and other operations.

The scratch awl is a steel spike with its tip sharpened to a fine point. The tip of the spike is drawn across the timber, leaving a shallow groove. It may also be used to mark a point by pressing the tip into the timber. It is generally used when dimensioning and for laying out with the grain. It may also be used across the grain. However, a marking knife is preferred for this operation.

Scratch awls are traditionally used in leather crafting to trace patterns onto leather. They are sometimes used in the automotive and sheet metal trades to punch holes and scribe lines in sheet metal.

== See also ==
- Bradawl
- Stitching awl
