= Bradawl =

Woodworking hand tool

A bradawl is a woodworking hand tool with a blade similar to that of a straight screwdriver and a handle typically made from wood or plastic. An awl is any kind of small pointed tool.

== Purpose ==
A bradawl is used to make indentations in wood or other materials in order to ease the insertion of a nail or screw. The blade is placed across the fibres of the wood, cutting them when pressure is applied. The bradawl is then twisted through 90 degrees which displaces the fibres creating a hole. This cutting action helps to prevent splitting of the wood along the grain.

== Gallery ==
Bradawls

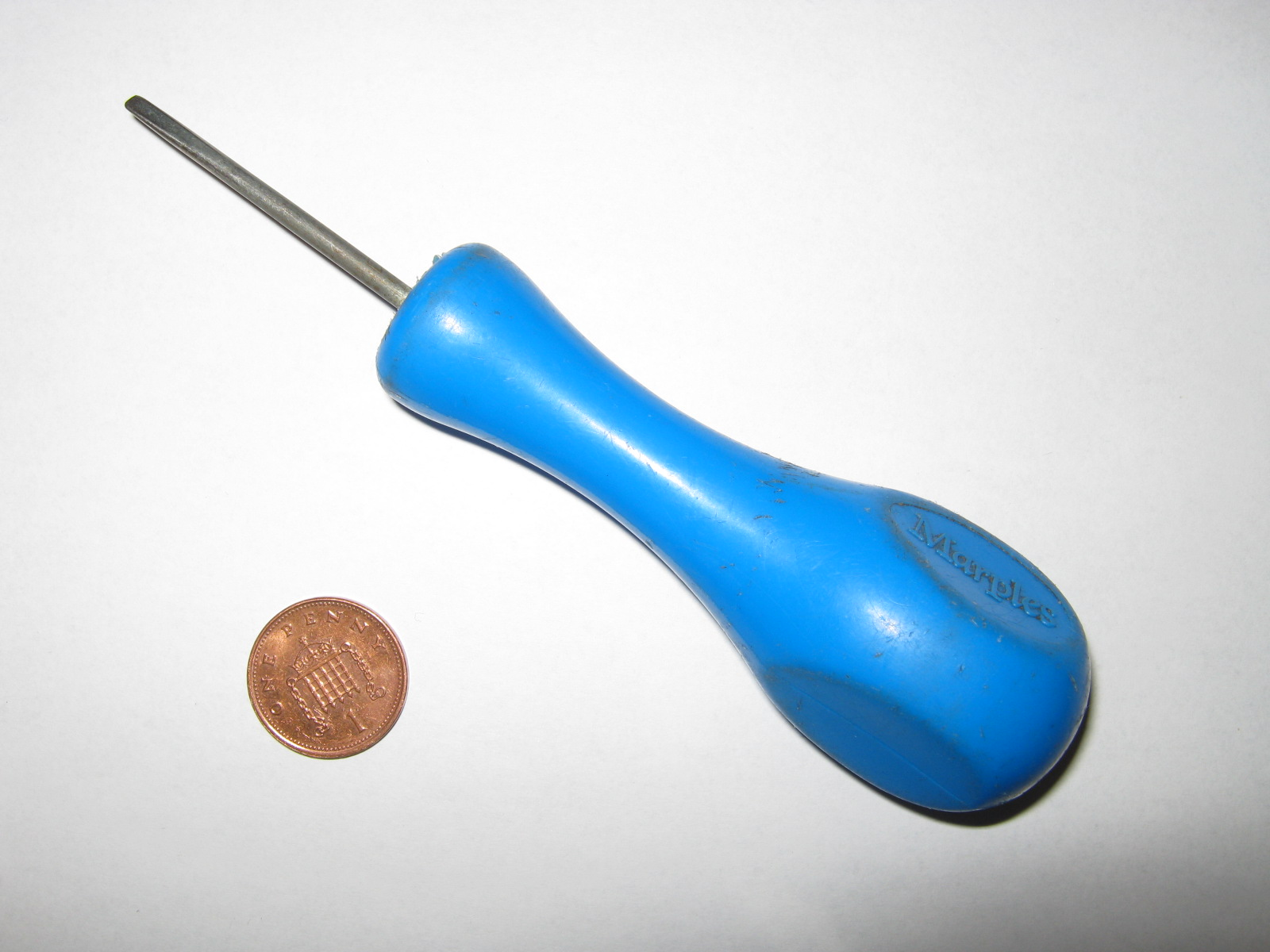
A modern bradawl.

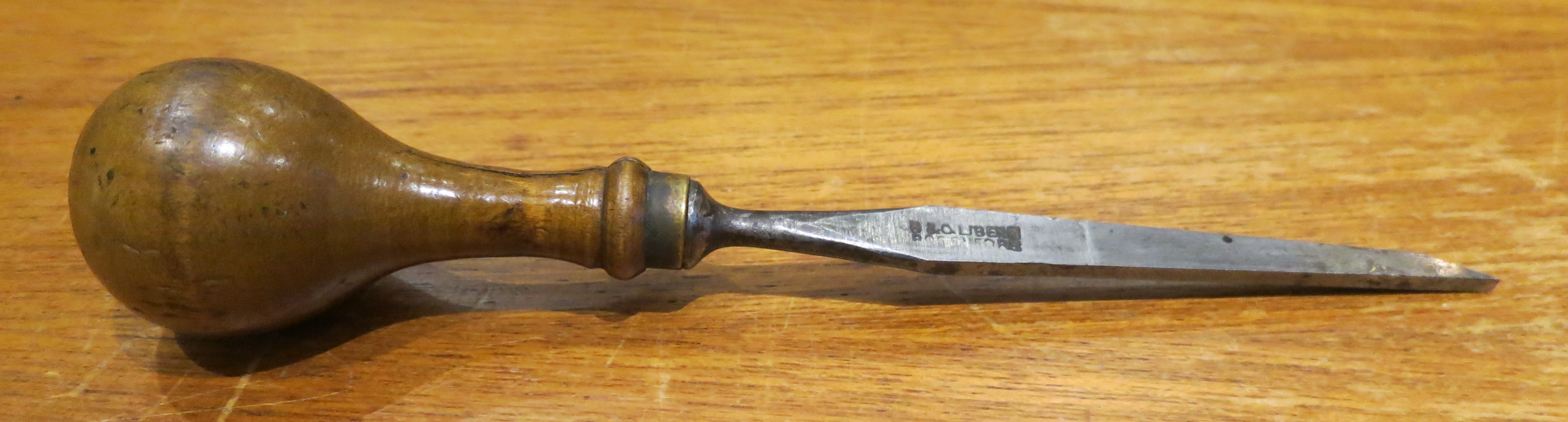
Swedish bradawl from around 1900. ( This appears to be an ornate 1/8" Sash Mortice Chisel, not a Bradawl)

== See also ==
- Gimlet
- Scratch awl
- Stitching awl
