= L. S. Starrett Company =

American manufacturer of tools

Coordinates: 42°35′43″N 72°13′34″W

The L.S. Starrett Company

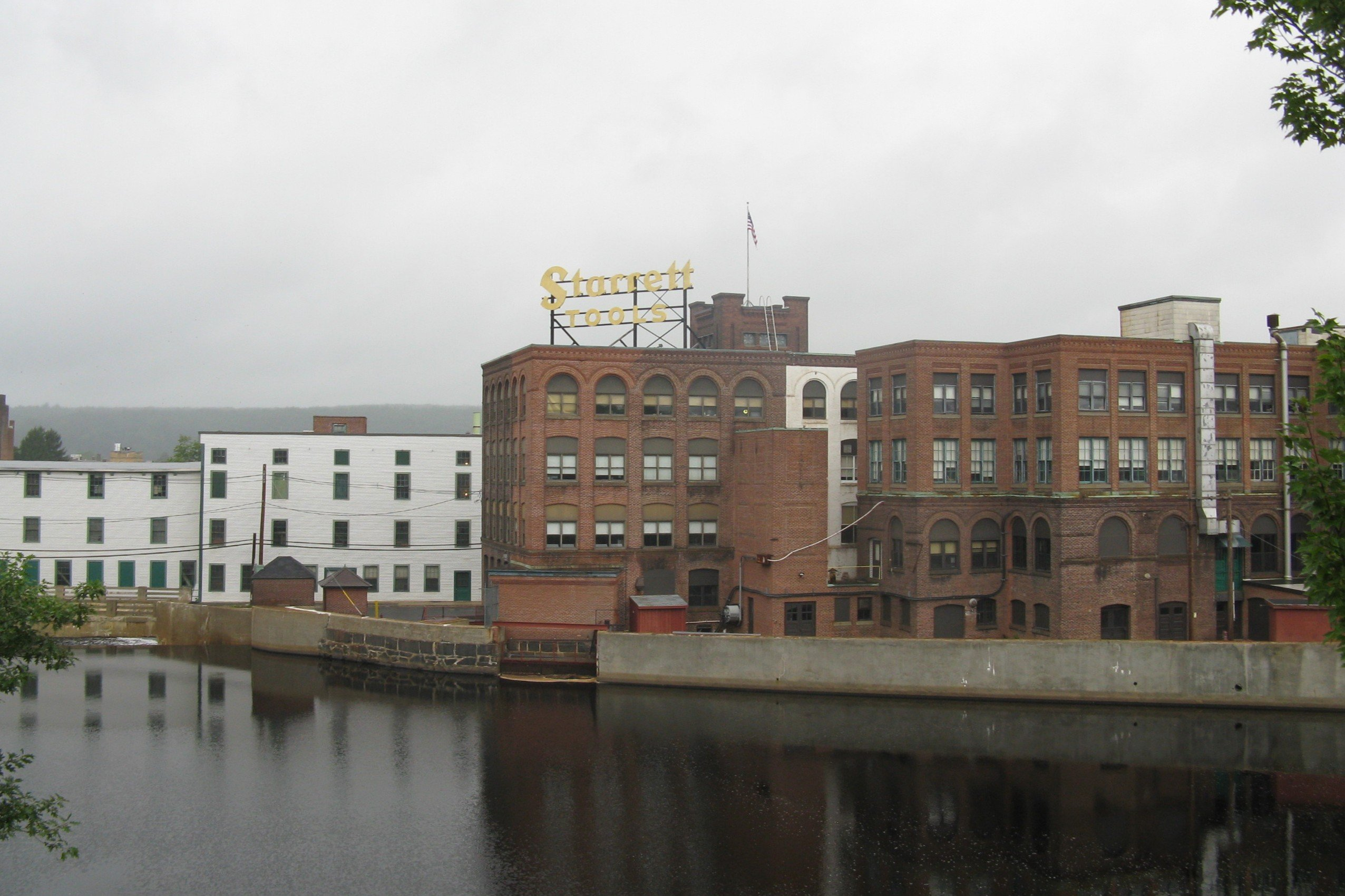
- Starrett Tools in Athol, Massachusetts
- Type: Privately held company
- Industry: Tools and instruments manufacturing
- Founded: 1880 in Athol, Massachusetts, United States
- Founder: Laroy Sunderland Starrett
- Headquarters: Athol, Massachusetts, United States
- Key people: Douglas A. Starrett (President and CEO)
- Owner: MiddleGround Capital
- Number of employees: 1458 (2020)
- Website: www.starrett.com

The L. S. Starrett Company is an American manufacturer of tools and instruments used by machinists, tool and die makers, and the construction industry. It claims to produce 5,000 variations of precision tools, gauges, measuring instruments and saw blades as of 2025.

The company was founded by businessman and inventor Laroy Sunderland Starrett in 1880. The company patented such items as the sliding combination square, bench vises, and a shoe hook fastener. It makes precision steel rules and tapes, calipers, micrometers, and dial indicators, among others. In addition, Starrett manufacturers a wide variety of saw products including bandsaws, hole saws, jigsaws, amongst other power tool accessories and cutting tools. More recently, they have expanded their high-end metrology equipment including optical comparators, vision systems, laser measurement, force and material measurement testing.

Starrett employed about 2,000 people worldwide as of 2008. Manufacturing takes place at facilities in the People's Republic of China, Brazil, Germany, and the UK, with 28% of Starrett's worldwide sales being in Brazil in 2013.

== History ==
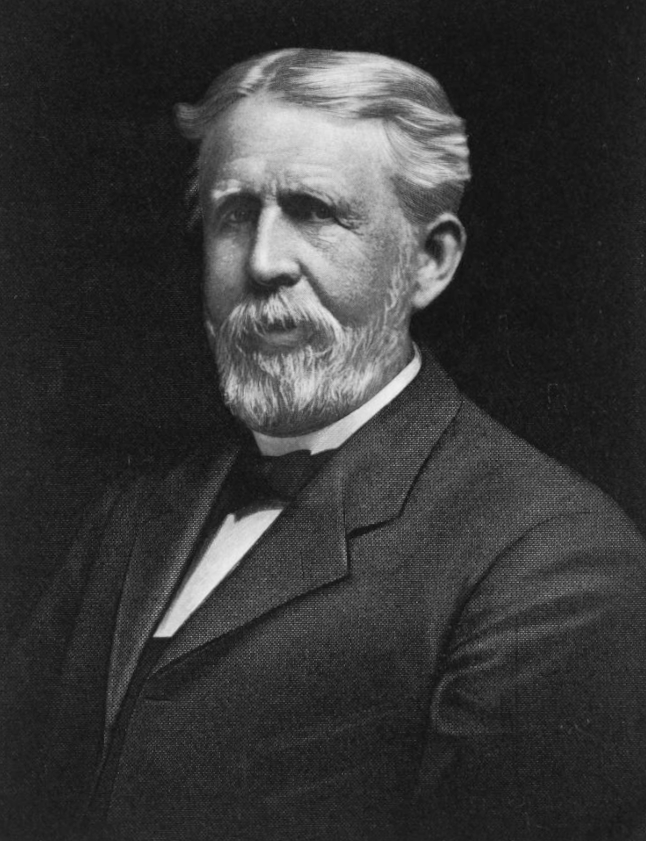
Laroy S. Starrett (1836–1922)

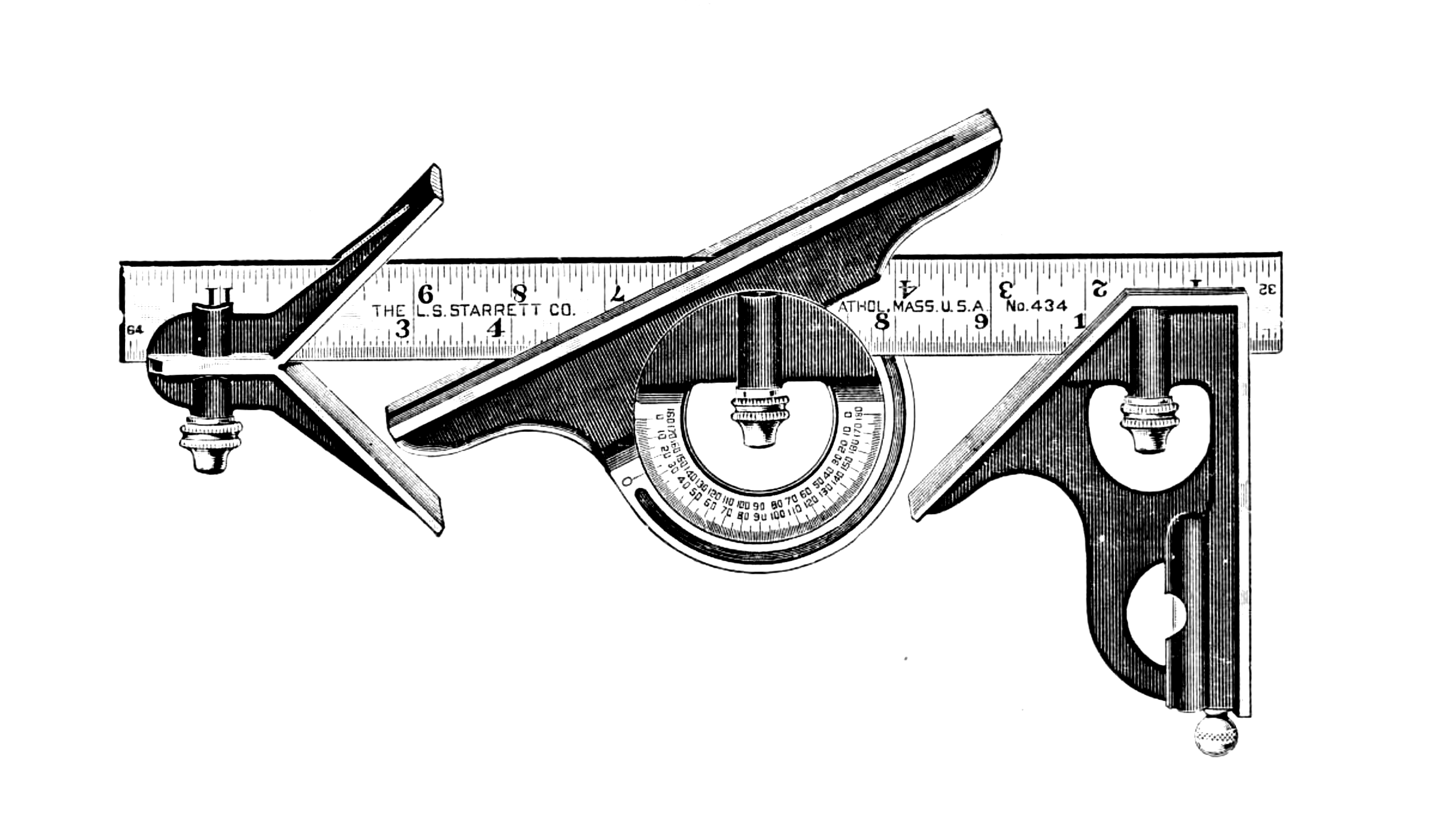
Illustration of a Starrett combination square set

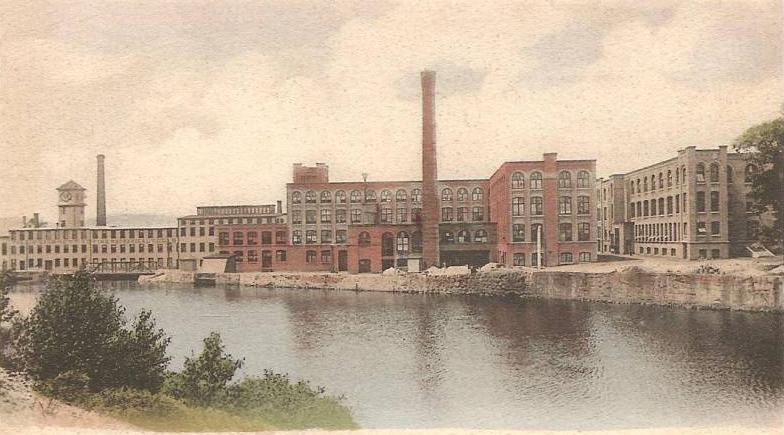
The Starrett plant in 1905

Laroy S. Starrett invented and patented the first combination square in 1878. Two years later he founded the Starrett corporation in Athol, Massachusetts, as L.S. Starrett Company to produce it and other precision tools. In 1882, Starrett traveled to London and Paris to appoint sales representatives. In 1887, Starrett acquired further patents.

In 1890, L.S. Starrett patented an improved micrometer. During the same year Starrett began making and improving saw blades, and continues to be a major manufacturer as of 2015. In 1895 Starrett patented the divider with a trammel. In 1920, the company added its first gauge to the product line and quickly became the world's largest innovator and maker of precision calibrators.

During World War II Starrett increased its production 1941-1945 by 800% and won the Army-Navy "E" Award. At the same time, more than 400 employees went into the US armed forces. Starrett opened a factory in São Paulo, Brazil, in 1956, moved 100 km in the early 1970s to Itu.

In 1958, a plant was opened in Scotland, which currently makes products for the European and Asian markets. In 1962, Starrett acquired the Webber Gage Company, a maker of gauge blocks. In 1970, Starrett took over granite product maker Herman Stone Co., relocating production to a new plant in Mount Airy, North Carolina, in 1985 that also makes saws and measuring equipment.

In 1986, Starrett took over the Evans Rule Company, the world's largest tape measure manufacturer, and in 1990 the company bought Sigma Optical, a British manufacturer of optical profile projectors. In 1998, Starrett expanded into China, opening a new plant in Suzhou.

In 2002 allegations of fraud were made against Starrett over its RapidCheck Coordinate Measuring Machine. A Federal investigation found none and no charges filed.

In 2006, L.S. Starrett Co. purchased Tru-Stone Technologies Inc. in Waite Park, Minnesota, a maker of custom-engineered granite machine bases, for $19.8 million in cash.

In March 2024, with Douglas A Starrett as its President and CEO, L. S. Starrett Co. announced that it would be acquired by private equity firm MiddleGround Capital.

On June 5, 2024, L. S. Starrett Co. announced that it had completed a merger with an affiliate of MiddleGround and became a privately held company. This happens after it ceases to be publicly traded on the New York Stock Exchange from May 22 as NYSE:SCX.

== Gallery ==
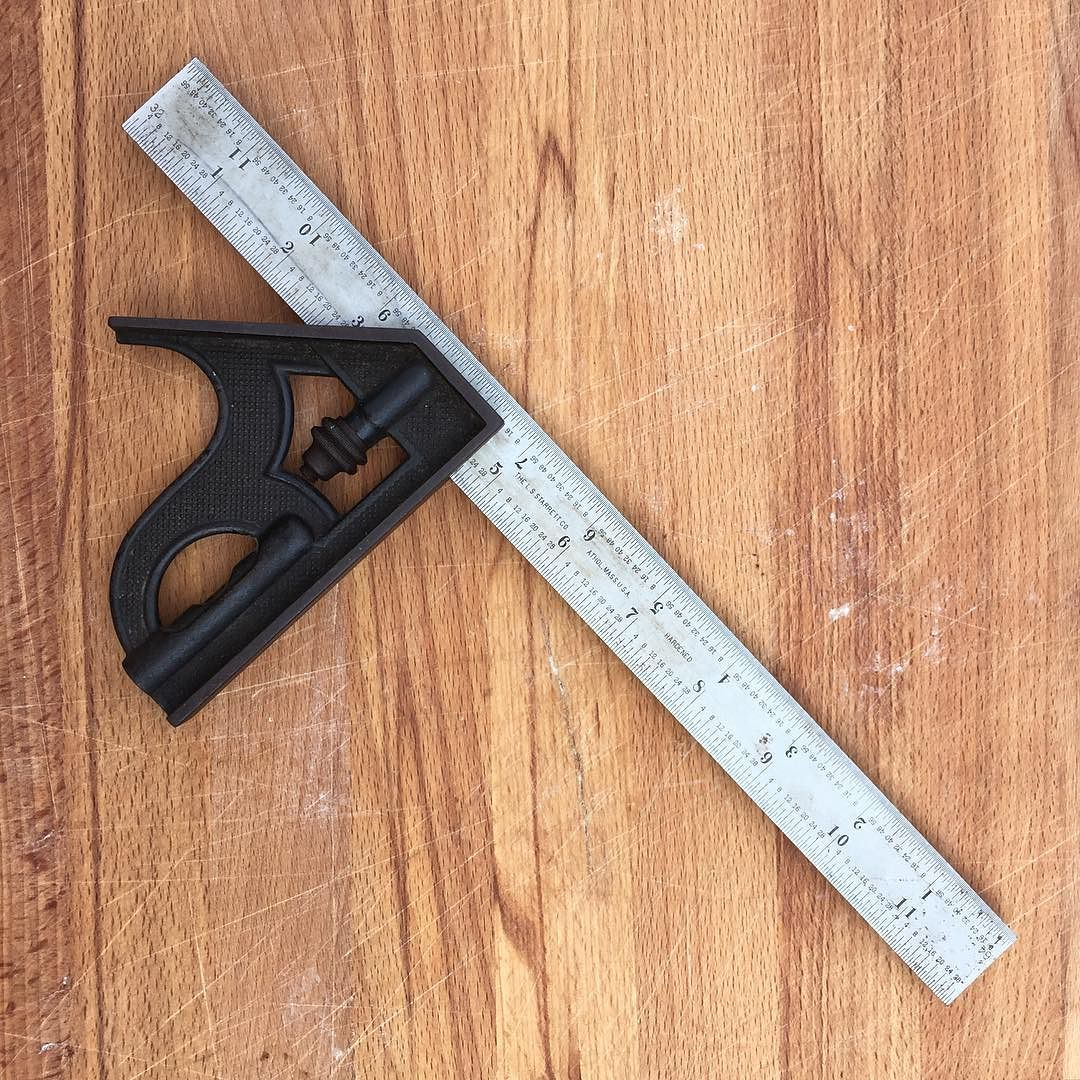
Starrett combination square

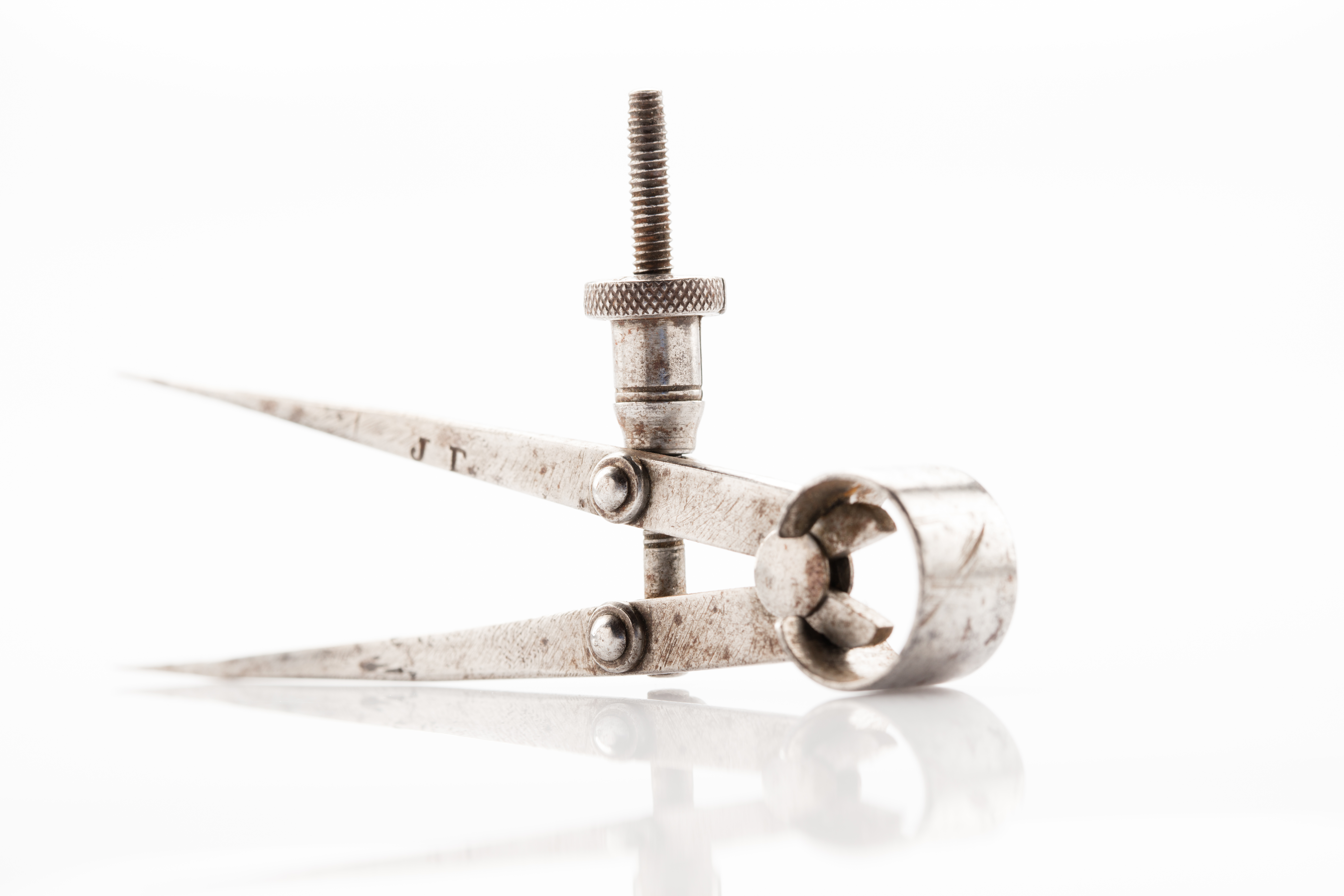
Starrett dividers

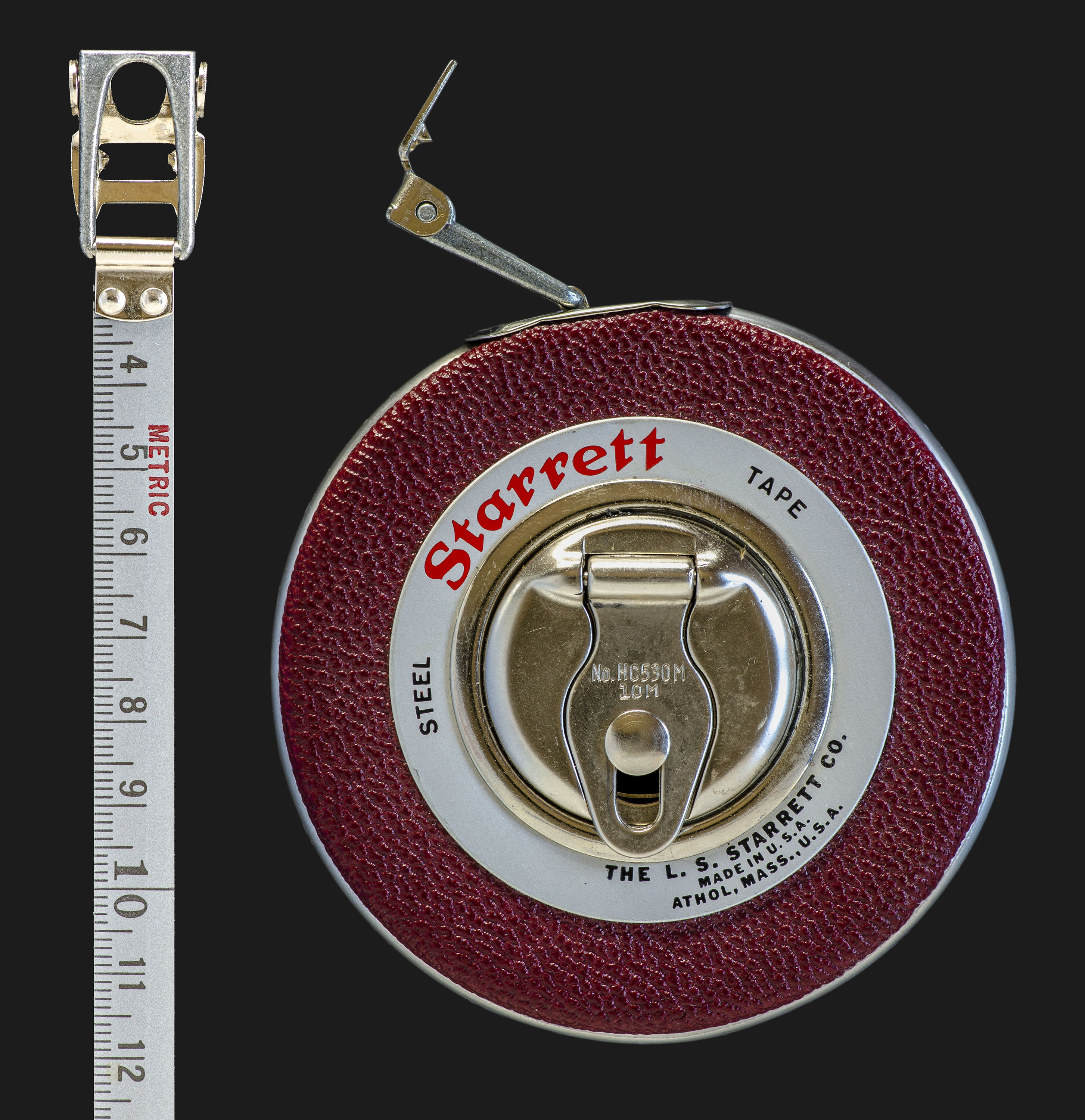
Starrett 10m tape measure

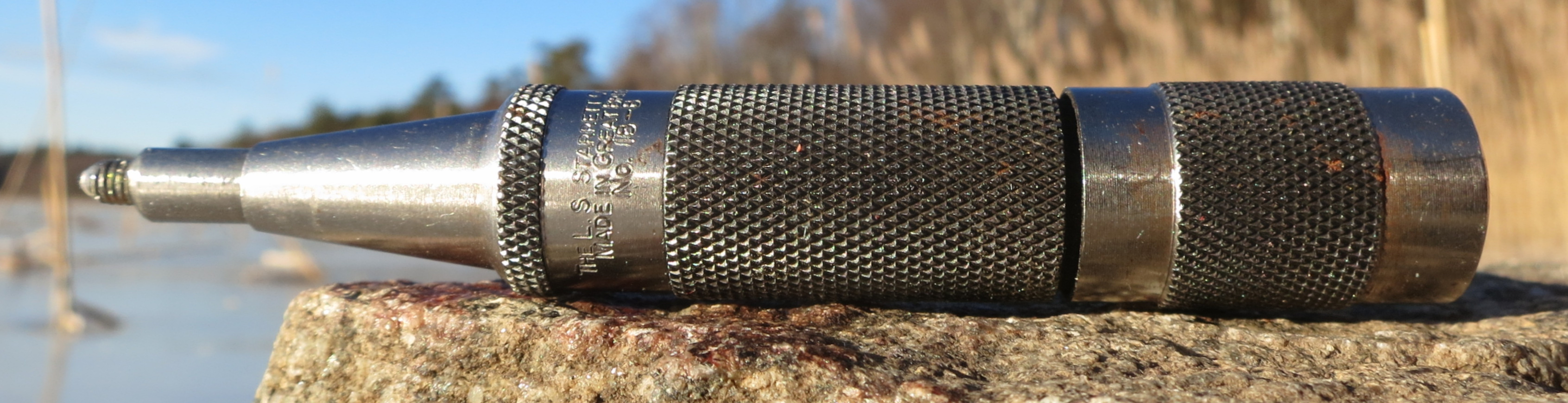
Starrett automated center punch from the late 1960s
