= Set square =

Object used in engineering and technical drawing

triangle, set square

A set square or triangle (American English) is an object used in engineering and technical drawing, with the aim of providing a straightedge at a right angle or other particular planar angle to a baseline.

== Types ==
The simplest form of set square is a triangular piece of transparent plastic (or formerly of polished wood) with the centre removed. More commonly the set square bears the markings of a ruler and a half circle protractor. The outer edges are typically bevelled. These set squares come in two usual forms, both right triangles: one with 90-45-45 degree angles, the other with 30-60-90 degree angles. Combining the two forms by placing the hypotenuses together will also yield 15° and 75° angles. They are often purchased in packs with protractors and compasses.

Less commonly found is the adjustable set square. Here, the body of the object is cut in half and rejoined with a hinge marked with angles. Adjustment to the marked angle will produce any desired angle up to a maximum of 180°.

== Geodreieck ==
Original Geodreieck

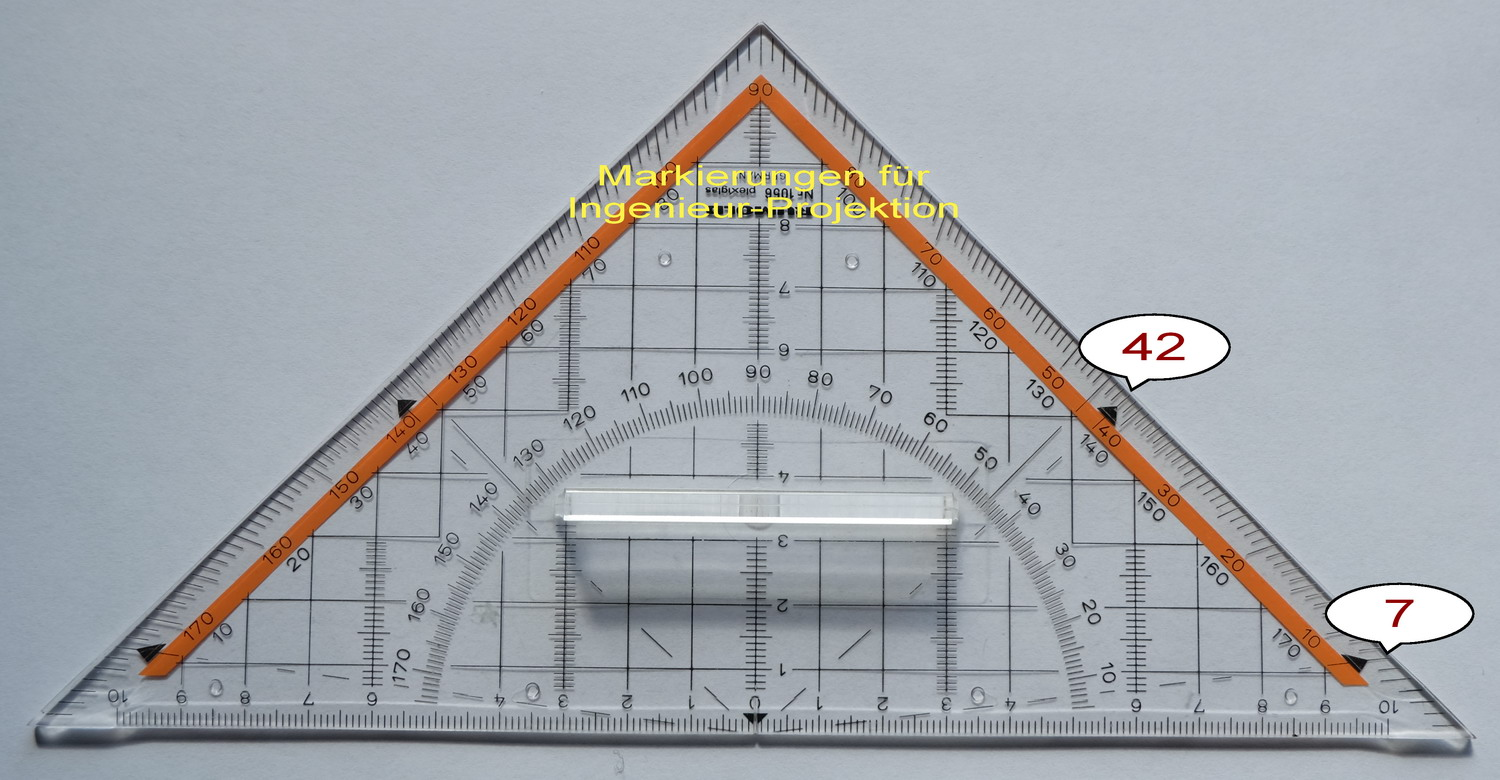
Variant of larger TZ-Dreieck with extra markings

In some European countries a common form of set square combines a 90-45-45 triangle, a ruler and a protractor into a single tool made of stiff or slightly flexible transparent plastic. Being a mandatory tool used by pupils in middle school and higher in German-speaking and neighbouring countries, this specific design is named "Geodreieck" (short form of "Geometrie-Dreieck", meaning "geometry triangle") or similar. It was originally developed in 1964 by the German manufacturer Dennert & Pape Aristo-Werke (after several refirmations now Geotec Schul- und Bürowaren GmbH). Relatively uncommon in English-speaking countries, this is sometimes called a "protractor triangle", a term, however, also used for other similar designs. The original design has a hypotenuse length of 15.8 cm and features a 2×7 cm symmetry scale in millimeter and degree raster. Variants in larger sizes, with fixed or detachable handles, with or without bevelled edges (facets), and with or without ink nodules or embossed labels exist as well. Some variants have extra markings at angles of 7° and 42° (138° and 173°) in addition to the normal 45° and 90° markings to ease dimetric axonometry per ISO 5456-3, others feature angle scales in gons instead of degrees. Several other somewhat similar designs named "TZ-Dreieck" ("TZ triangle") exist for (larger) technical drawings (TZ from German: Technisches Zeichnen). The scale reaches from 10 to 10 cm, or even 11 to 11 cm.

== Navigation protractor triangles ==
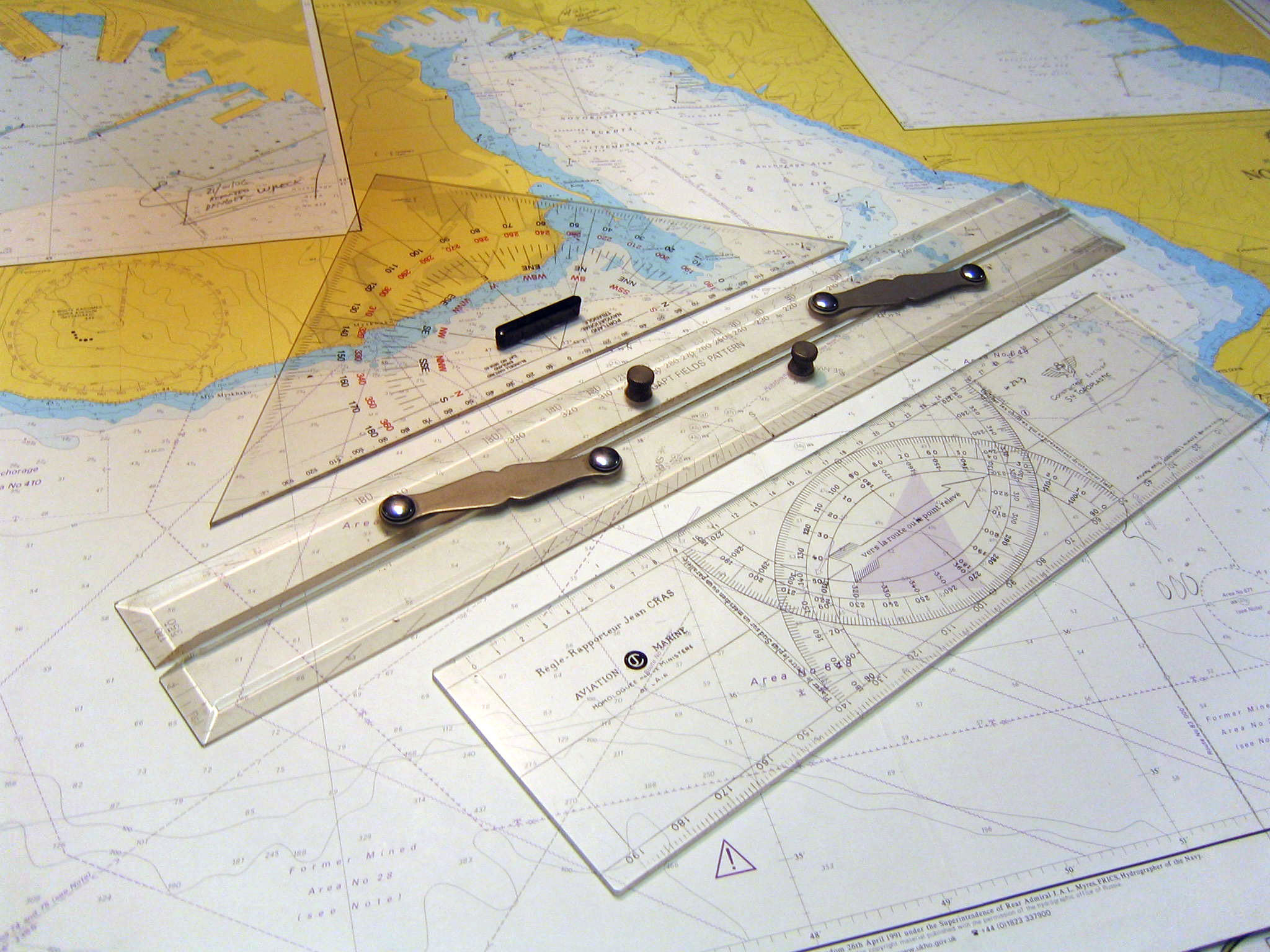
Navigational Cras protractor (foreground)

Similar to the Geodreieck, a number of other protractor triangle types exist for navigation purposes. Various designs are named navigation (protractor) triangle, nautical navigational triangle, nautical set square, Portland (navigational) triangle or Portland protractor triangle, Kent-type triangle, Inoue-type A/B nautical triangle or plotting triangle, course triangle, yachtsmen triangle, and supporting triangle.

However, some widely used navigational protractors, such as the Cras protractor, are not triangles.

== See also ==
- Speed square
- Square (tool)
- Technical drawing tool
