= Speed square =

Triangular tool used by carpenters

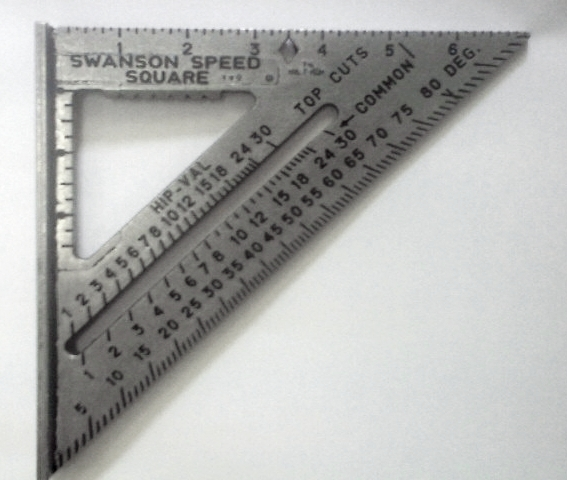
A Swanson Speed Square

A speed square, also called a rafter square, rafter angle square, and triangle square, is a multi-purpose triangular carpenters' tool used for marking out. Its functions encompass many of those offered by combination squares, try squares, and framing squares. Carpenters use it to make basic measurements and mark lines on dimensional lumber, and as a saw guide for short 45 and 90 degree cuts.

"Speed Square" is a registered trademark of the Swanson Tool Company in the United States, though the term is often used generically for squares of this type.

== History ==
Albert J. Swanson invented the "A" Speed Square in 1925 as a carpenter's layout tool. He later founded the Swanson Tool Company to mass produce his invention. Today, the Swanson Tool Company still manufactures and distributes the Speed Square and other carpentry tools from its headquarters in Frankfort, Illinois.

== Design ==
The Speed Square is manufactured from a variety of materials such as aluminum, steel, and composites such as HDPE. They are also made in several sizes such as 4, 6, 7, 8 and 12 in (100, 150, 180, 200 and 300 mm), and 250 mm.

Embedded degree gradations on the tool eliminate the need for trigonometric calculations and allow for lines to be more easily made.

The Speed Square tool is an isosceles right triangle with a ruler on one equal side and a fence on the other. It is marked with the word Pivot at the right angle point and displays Degrees on its hypotenuse, Common and Hip/Val markings on its midsection.

- Degree indicates the angle in degrees from 0° to 90°.
- Common indicates the rise in inches over a 12 inch run for common rafters from 1 inch to 30 inch.
- Hip/Val indicates the rise in inches over a 17 inch run for hip or valley rafters from 1 inch to 30 inch.

Some models have divots for fitting a writing utensil to mark lumber with. Speed squares made by the Swanson Tool Company also have a diamond shape cutout on the ruler side at 3½ inches.

== Uses ==
Among its basic uses are marking common, hip, valley and hip, or valley jack rafters, laying out stair stringers, determining and marking angles, and making square cuts on boards.

Common lines made using a speed square include perpendicular cut marks and Angles definition of an angle for roofs, stairways, and decks.

The tool uses a 0° reference. This means when a board is squared off the tool reads 0°. The angle derived is actually a complementary angle, for example a 22.5° angle is actually 67.5°. The sum of the angles equals 90 degrees (22.5° +67.5°= 90°). It is also obvious from a visual check when using a protractor that where the instruments displays 22.5° is actually 67.5° on the protractor. Many newer slide miters and miter boxes display both angles. Some of the new calculators have a 0° and a 90° references. The only true angle is 45° on the triangular square. This can create confusion if the user does not understand this angular calibration when using trigonometric functions. The FIRST image below shows ⊾ P = 20° on the protractor and ⊾ T = 20° on the angle Square. The only similarity is that both of the angles are acute angle and complimentary. When the image is enlarged the protractor is on the ⊾ 20° index and the body rests on the edged face of the 2X4. The square is pivoted on the (left side 2x4) and locked into the ⊾ 20° degree index at the red marked line. The SECOND image displays ⊾ X = 70° on the clear protractor that is graduated in 360°, ⊾ X = 20° on the Aluminum angle square. Both red lines ⊾ X are Parallel and thereby congruent. "Postulate 4.1 (P 64)" congruent angle *ISBN 978-0-7641-3918-5

Differences of angle square and protractor

20° on protractor and angle square

== See also ==
- Combination square
- Set Square
- Steel square
- Try square
