= Marking knife =

Woodworking layout tool

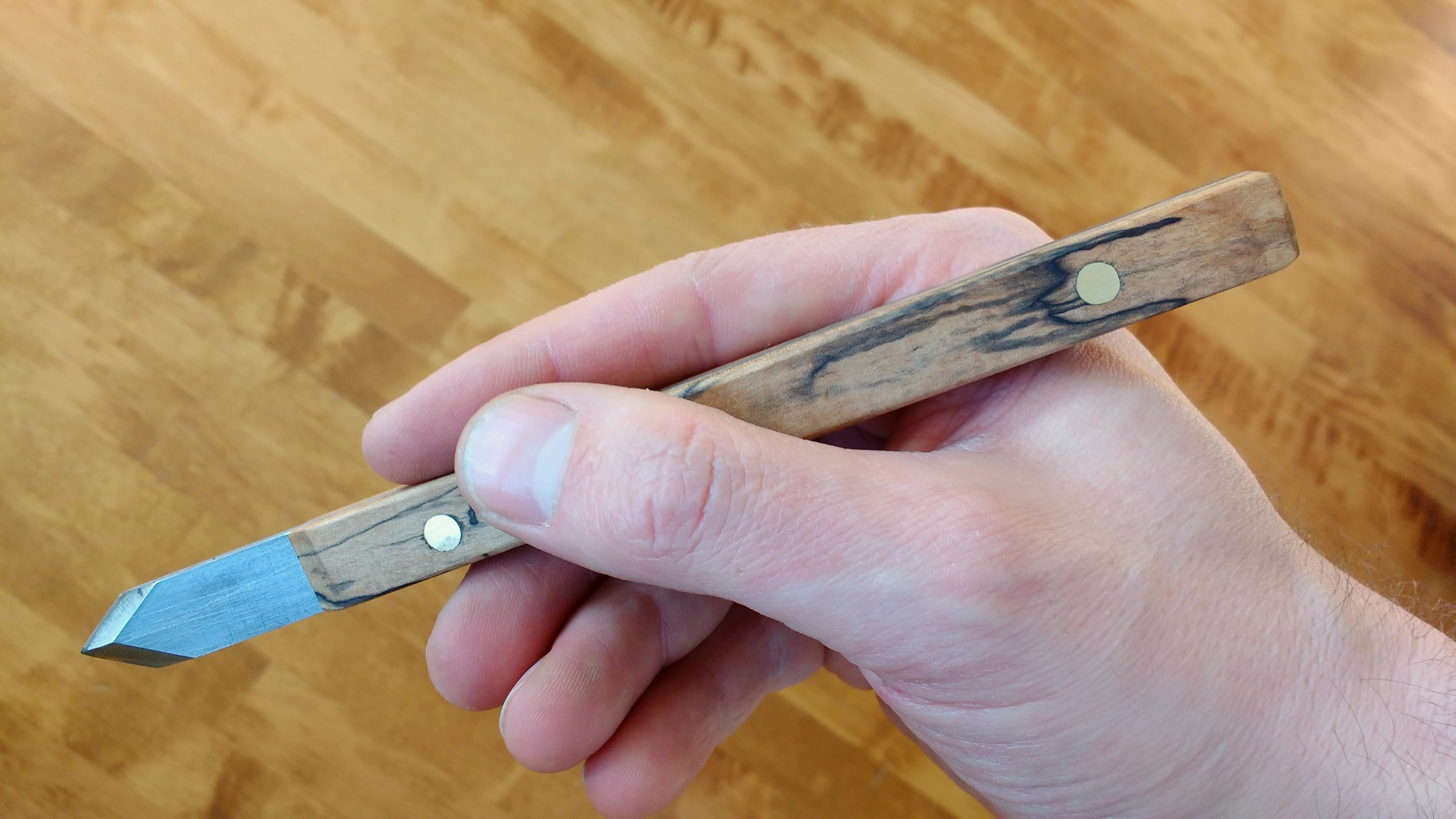
- Marking knife with a spear point blade
- Other names: Striking knife; Shirabiki
- Classification: Woodworking hand tool; Knife
- Used with: Straightedges, squares, scratch awls, pencils

A marking knife or striking knife is a woodworking layout tool used for accurately marking workpieces. It is used to cut a visible line, which can then be used to guide a hand saw, chisel or plane when making woodworking joints and performing other operations. They are generally used when marking across the grain of the wood, with scratch awls better suited for marking with the grain.

== Description ==
The blades on marking knives are made of tool steel, have either a skewed end or a spear point, and the knife edge is bevelled on either one side of the blade or both sides. On single-bevel skewed knives the side of the blade that is bevelled dictates whether the knife is for left-handed or right-handed use, while single-bevel spear point knives are suited to both.

Some marking knives incorporate a marking knife blade at one end, and a scratch awl tip at the other end – but because of this they are sometimes considered dangerous to use.

Marking knives are either made from a single piece of steel, or additionally have a handle made of wood or plastic.

Some woodworkers make their own marking knives, for example from spade bits or planer blades.

== Use ==
Marking knives are usually held like a pencil, and are guided using a straightedge or square. Sometimes woodworkers will gently run a sharp pencil along the line afterwards to make it more visible.

Marking knives are sharpened in a similar manner to chisels or other bladed tools – using sharpening stones, files or sandpaper.

== Shirabiki ==
A shirabiki is a Japanese marking knife made from a single piece of steel with a skewed single-bevel blade.

A double-bladed shirabiki is used for marking parallel lines. They are made with two parallel blades and a thumbscrew for adjusting the distance between the blades.

== Gallery ==
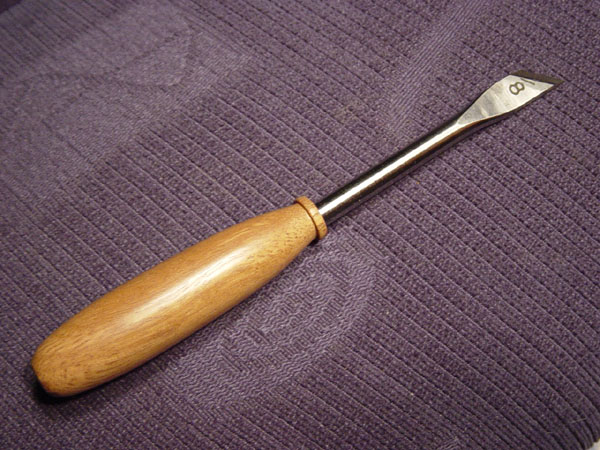
Marking knife with a skewed blade, made from a spade bit.

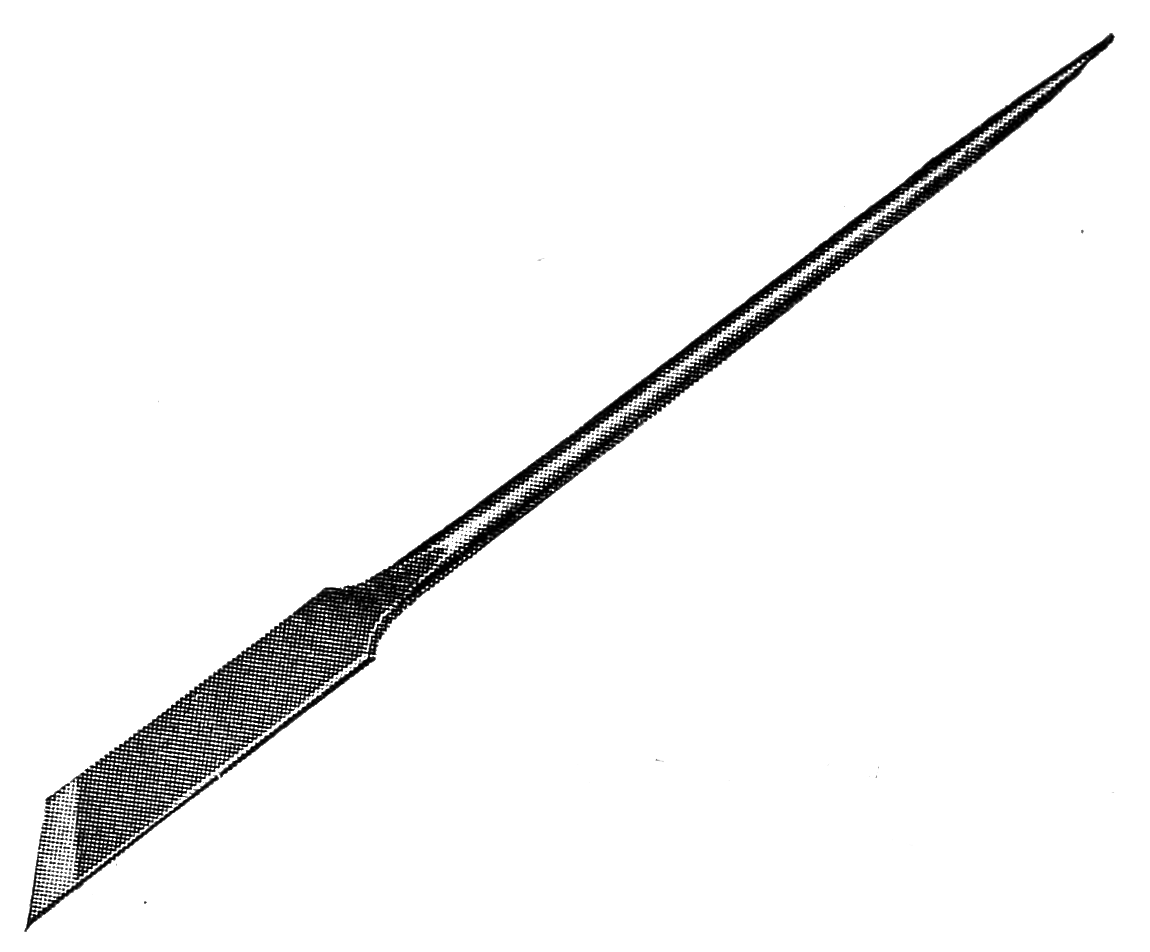
Combination marking knife and scratch awl

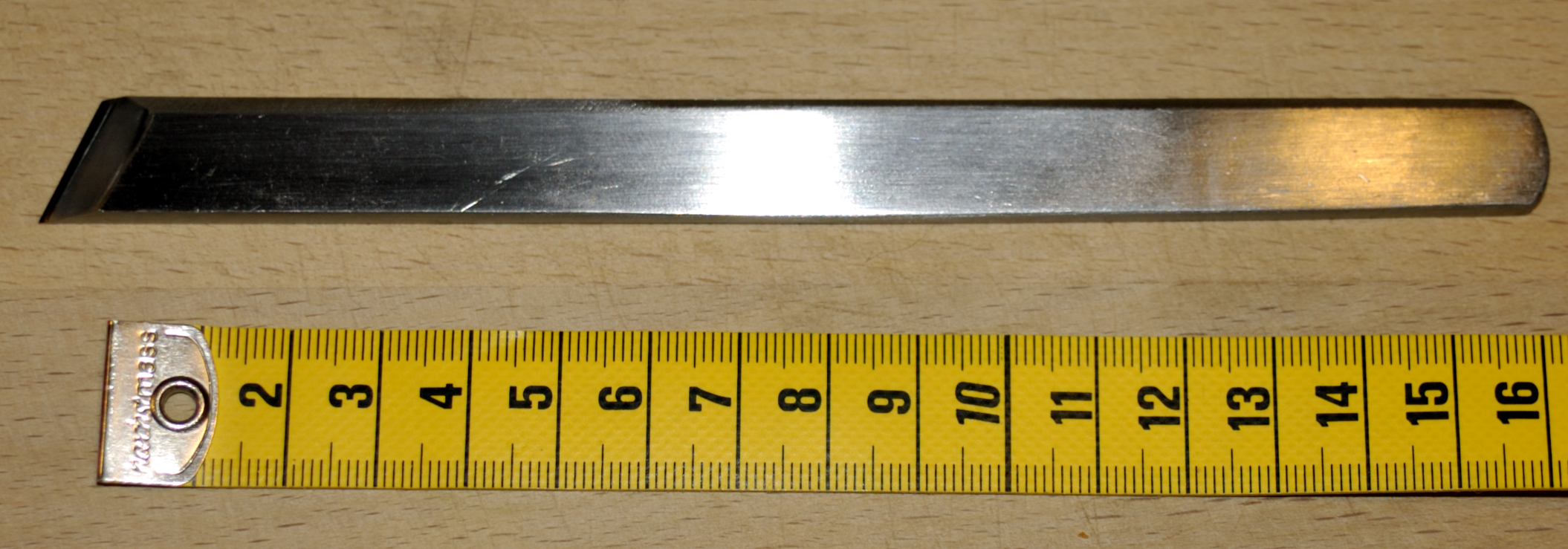
Japanese shirabiki marking knife.

== See also ==
- Scratch awl
