= Siddons =

Siddons is a surname. Notable people with the surname include:

- Anne Rivers Siddons (1936–2019), American novelist
- Bill Siddons, manager of the band The Doors (1968–1972)
- Frederick Lincoln Siddons (1864–1931), U.S. federal judge
- Harold Siddons (1922–1963), Northern Irish actor
- Harriet Siddons (1783–1844), Scottish actress and theatre manager, wife of Henry Siddons and daughter-in-law of Sarah Siddons
- Henry George Impey Siddons (c. 1851 – 1936), Indian educationist
- Henry Siddons (1774–1815), Scottish actor, theatre manager, and writer, husband of Harriet Siddons and son of Sarah Siddons
- Jamie Siddons (born 1964), Australian cricketer
- John Siddons (1927–2016), retired Australian politician
- Michael Siddons (born 1928), Wales Herald of Arms Extraordinary
- Michael John Siddons-Corby (born 1951), English guitarist
- Royston Siddons (1899–1976), Australian industrialist
- Sarah Siddons (1755–1831), British actress
- Dame Sarah Elizabeth Siddons Mair (1846–1941), Scottish suffragette campaigner
- William Siddons (1864–1893), English footballer

== See also ==
- Sarah Siddons Award, an annual award given by the Sarah Siddons Society in Chicago for outstanding performance in Chicago theater production
- Siddons Patera, a volcanic caldera on Venus
- Siddons Point, Livingston Island, South Shetland Islands, Antarctica
- "To Mrs Siddons", a sonnet written by Samuel Taylor Coleridge
- Siddon
