= Stanley Hand Tools =

Brand of hand tools; division of Stanley Black & Decker

- Logo used since 2013
- Product type: Hand tools
- Current owner: Stanley Black & Decker
- Country: United States
- Introduced: 1857; 169 years ago
- Previous owners: The Stanley Works
- Website: www.stanleytools.com

Stanley Hand Tools is a brand of hand tools. It is a division of Stanley Black & Decker, following the merger of The Stanley Works with Black & Decker in March 2010.

== History ==
The Stanley Works was founded by Frederick Trent Stanley in 1843, originally a bolt and door hardware manufacturing company located in New Britain, Connecticut.

The Stanley Rule and Level Company was founded in 1857 by Frederick Trent Stanley's cousin, Henry Stanley, also in New Britain. In 1920, this company merged with the Stanley Works, and continued operating as its hand tools division. In 1869 Stanley purchased Bailey, Chaney and company which leads to the acquirement of the Bailey patents which gave permission to manufacture more tools.

Around 1937, Stanley acquired the British J. A. Chapman company, a British manufacturer of carpentry tools and other items (including bayonets during World War I) formerly located in Sheffield, from Norman Neill. This helped Stanley to enter the British market.

== Products ==
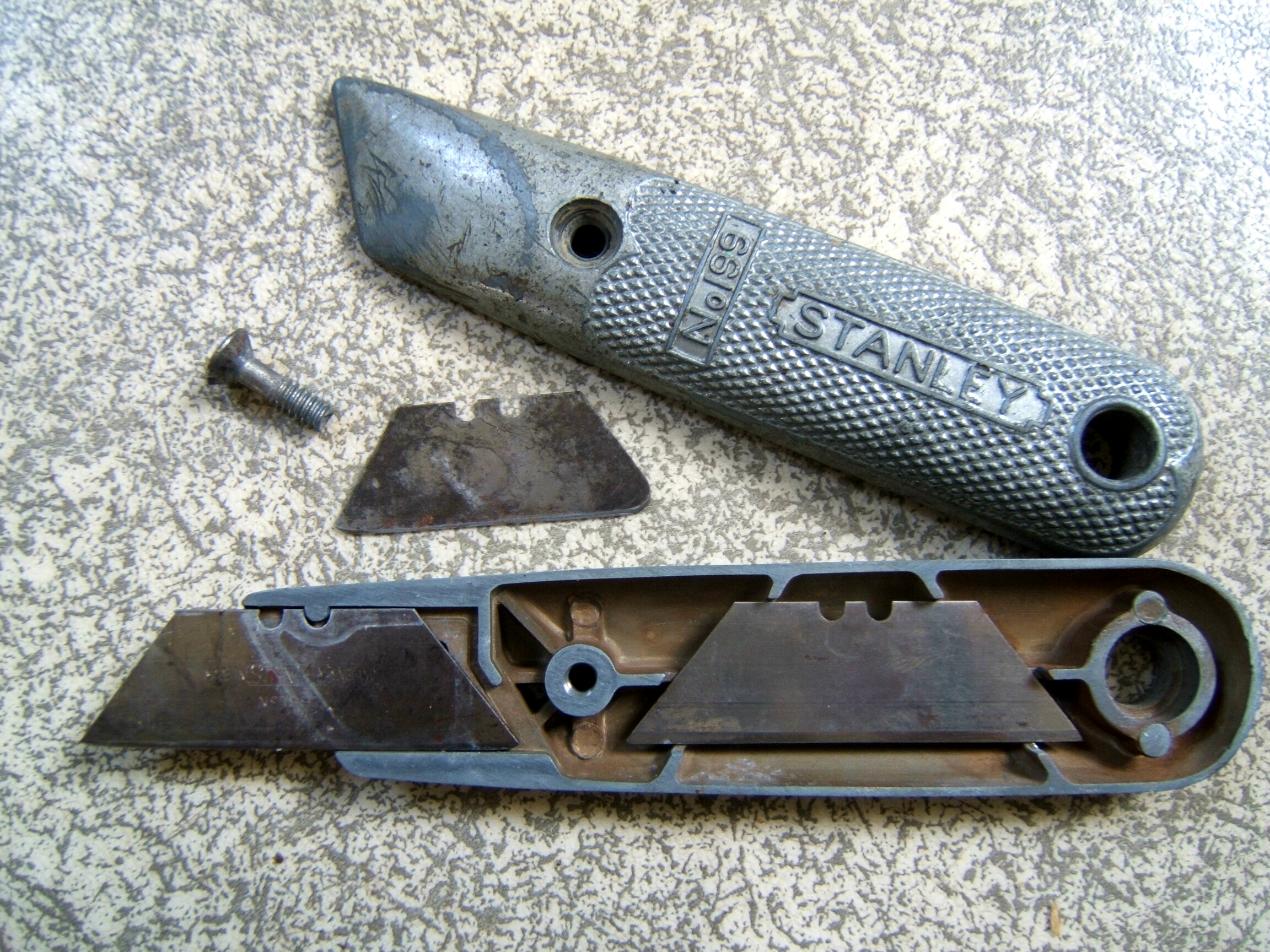
Early utility knife shown open

Stanley is a well known brand of tools and has produced millions of hand planes, saws, rulers, try squares, chisels, screwdrivers, and many other types of tools for consumer and for industrial use. Their innovations include the Bailey plane, the Surform shaper, the PowerLock tape measure, the utility knife, and a multi-tool known as the Stanley #1 Odd Jobs.

== Gallery ==
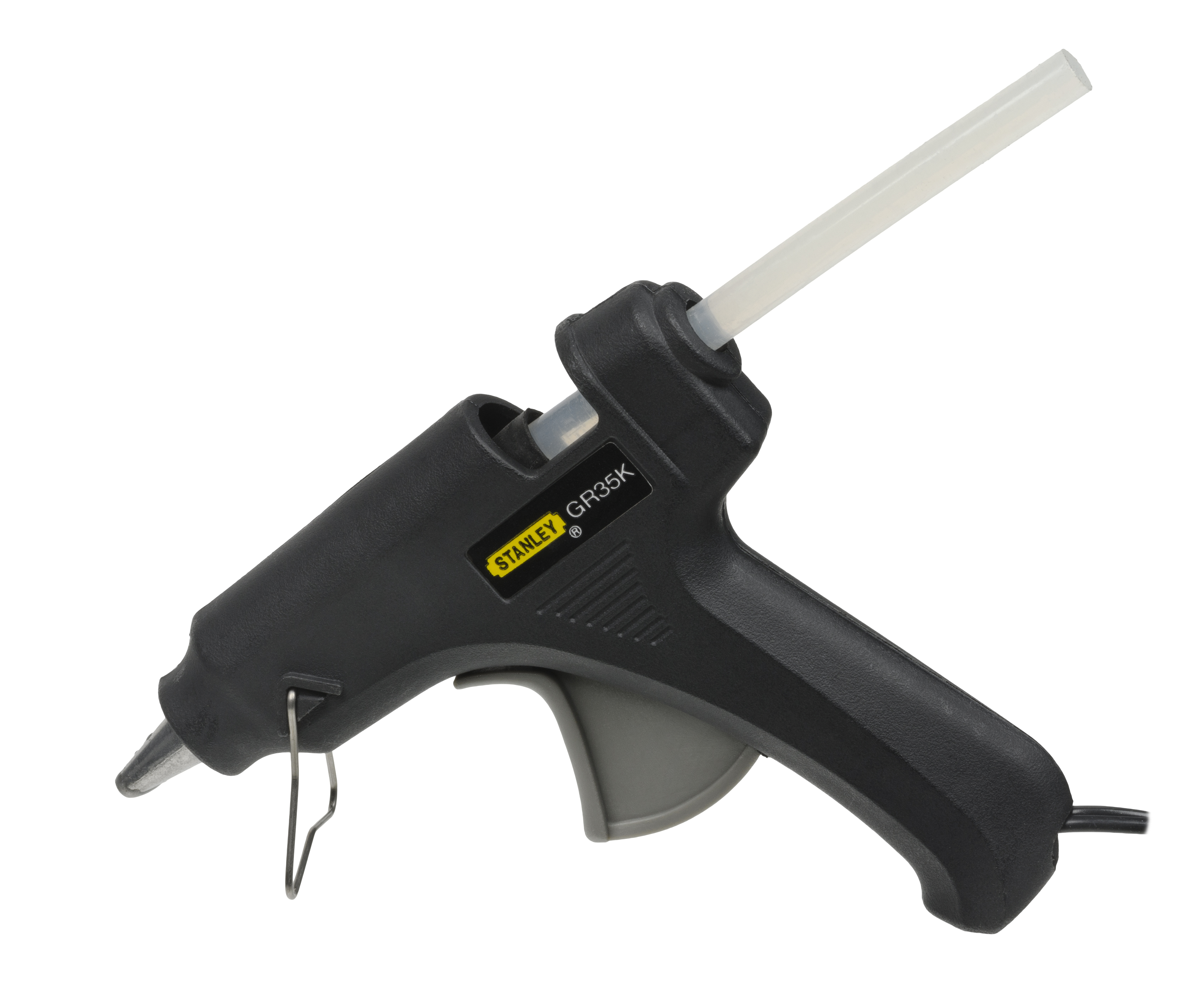
A hot glue gun

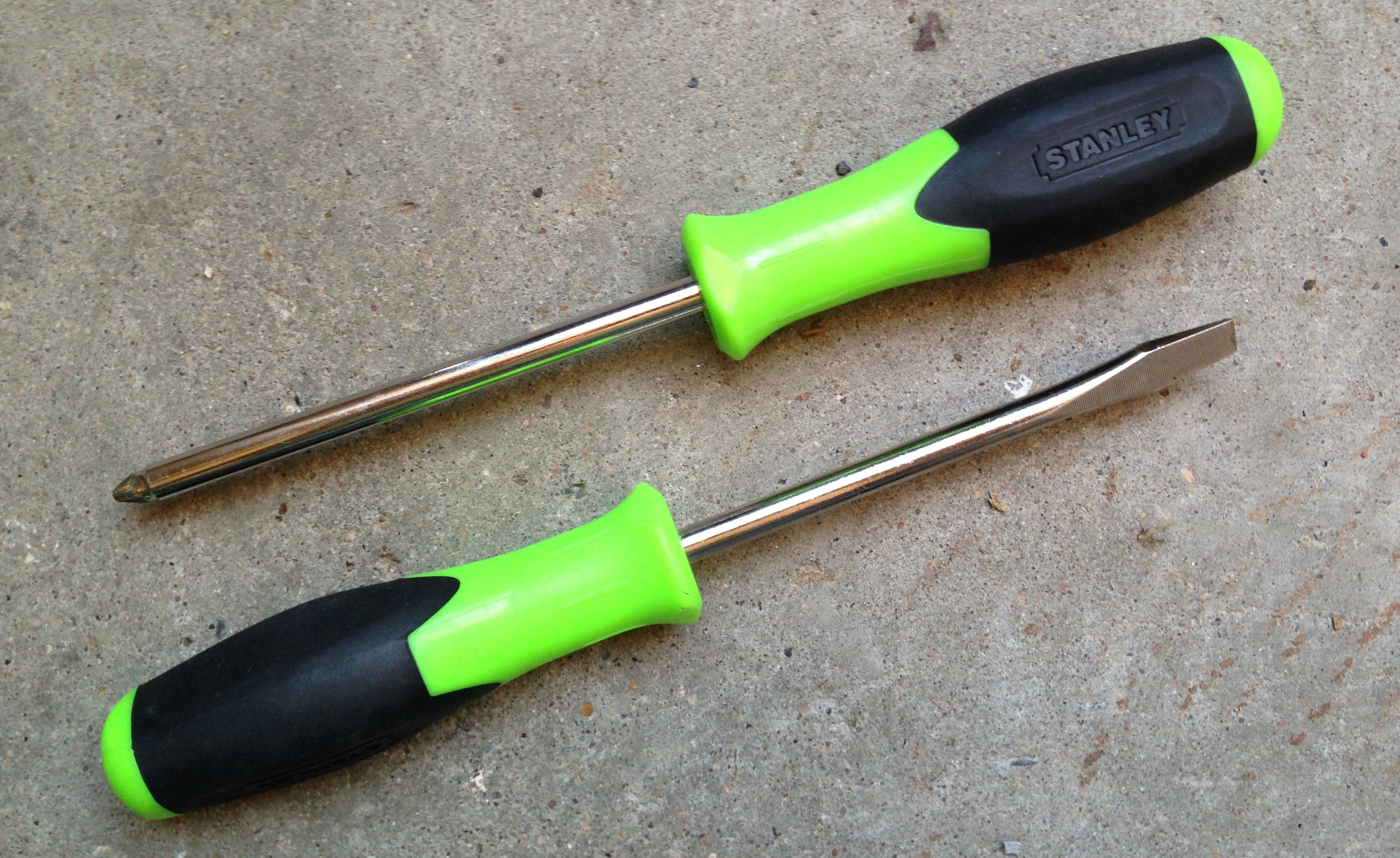
High-visibility green screwdrivers

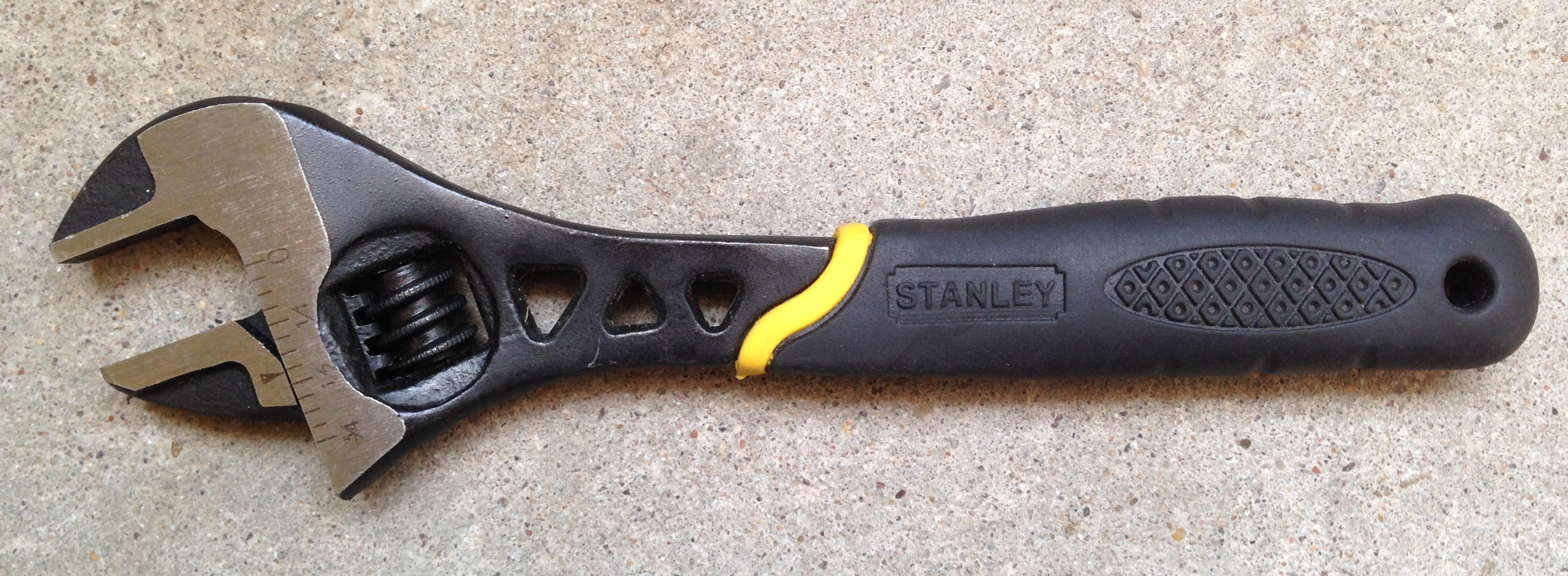
An adjustable wrench

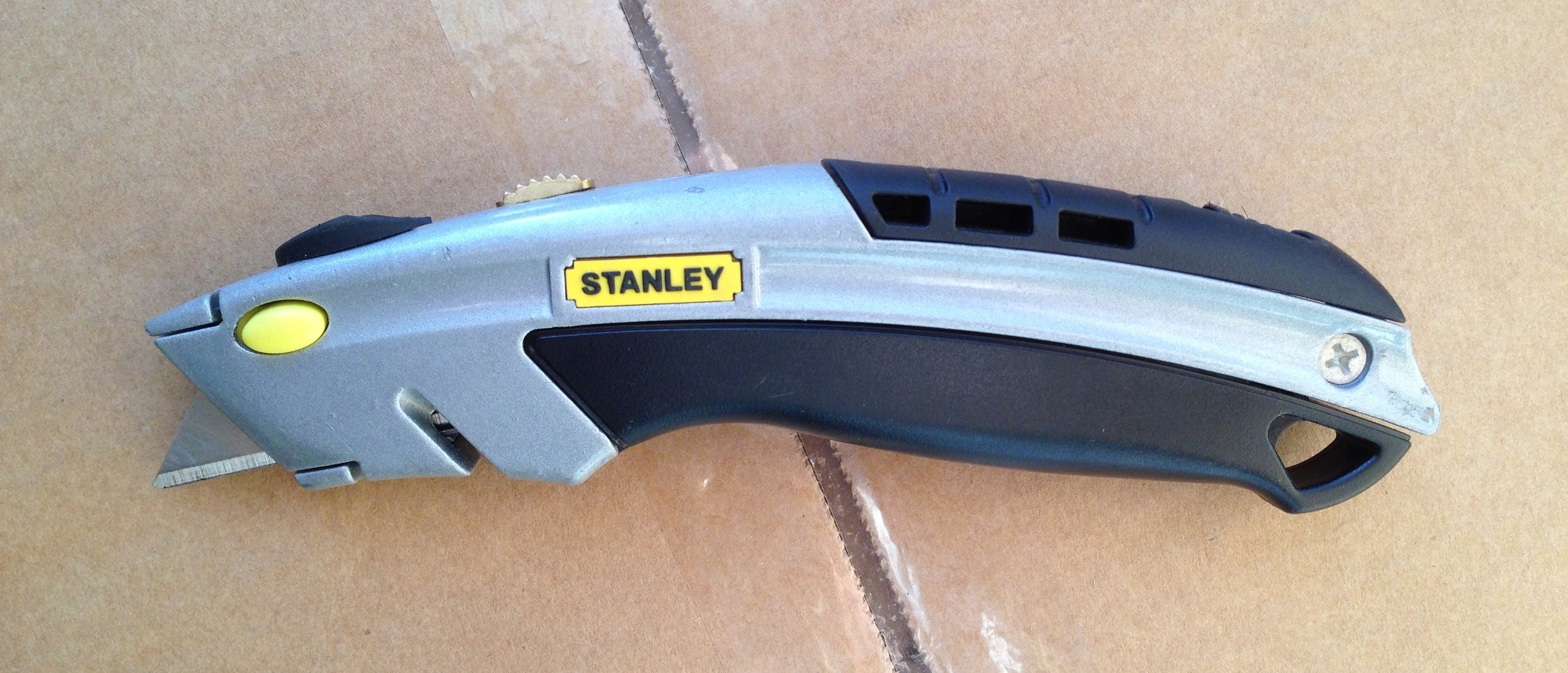
A "quick-change" utility knife

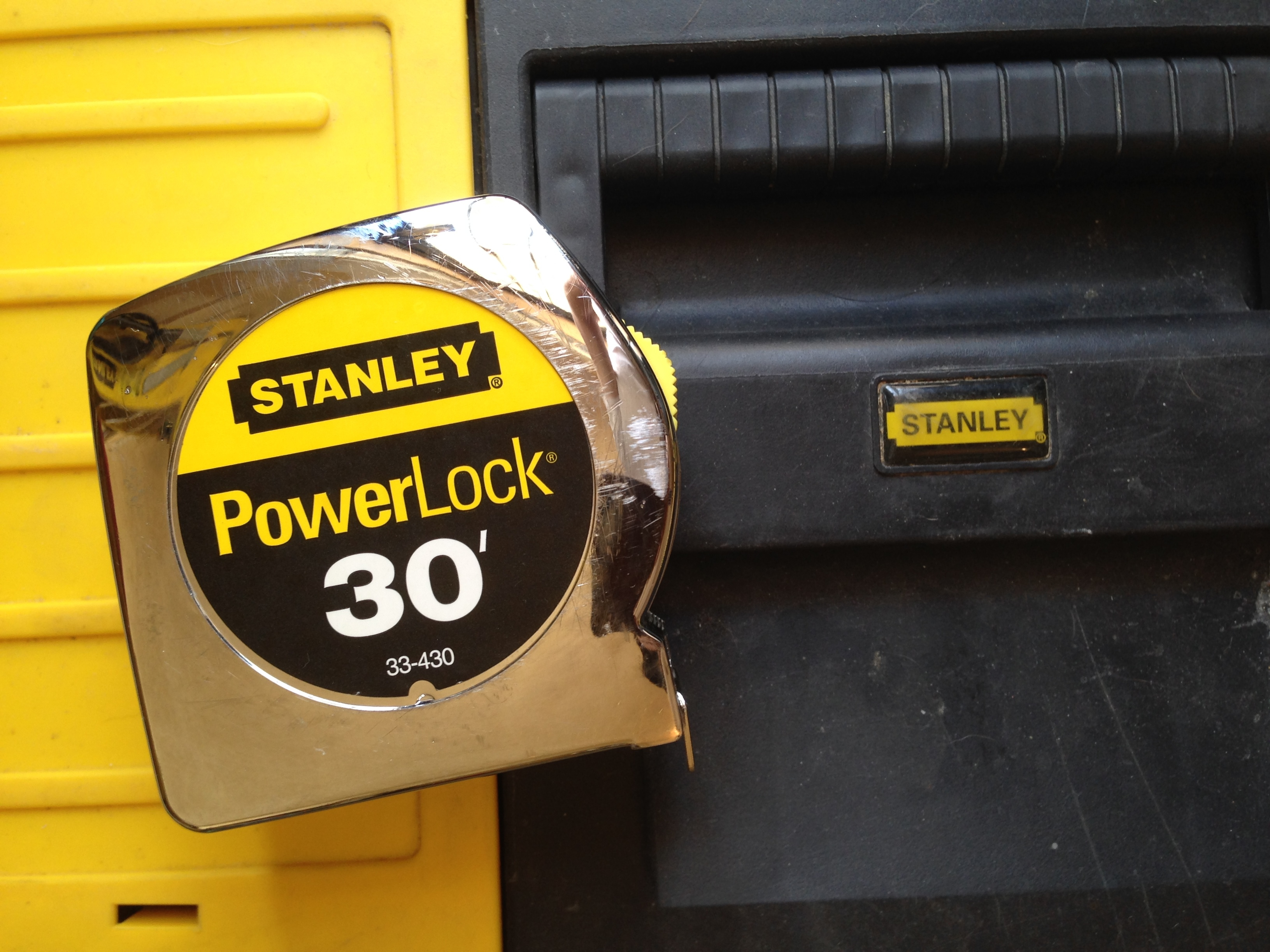
A Stanley tape measure and tool box

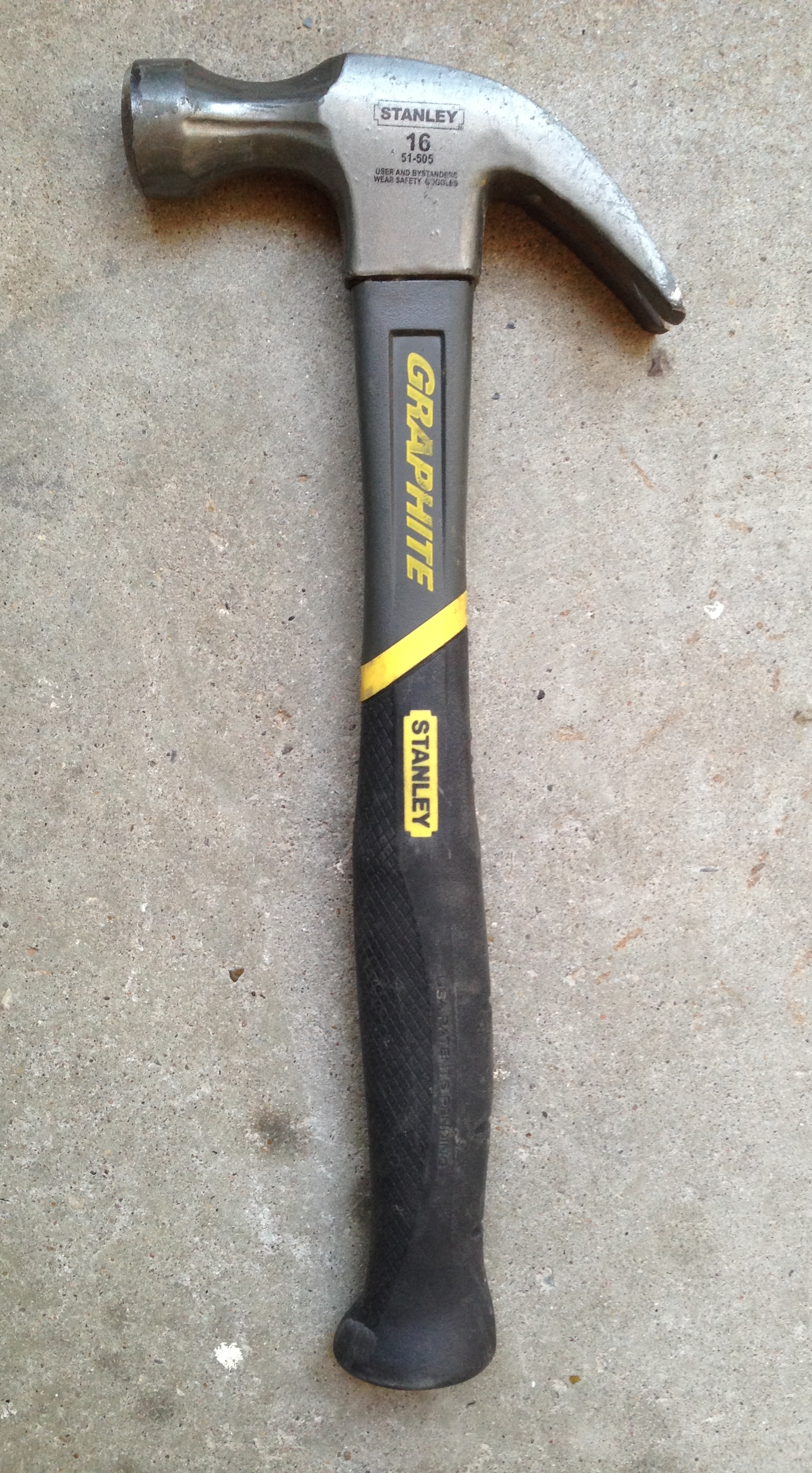
A claw hammer

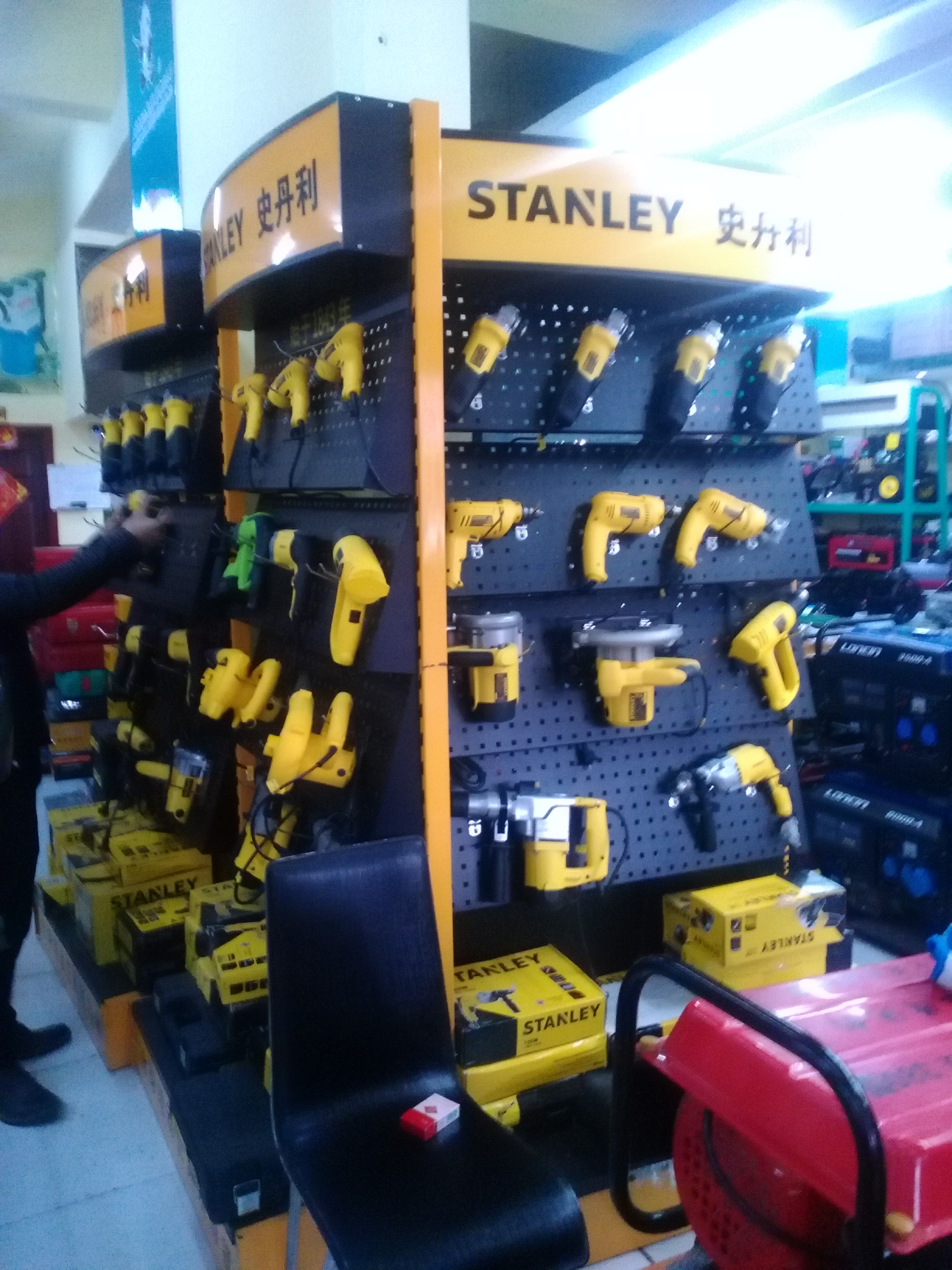
Stanley tools for sale in China
