= John Siddons =

Australian politician

John Siddons AO

Senator for Victoria
- In office 1 July 1981 – 4 February 1983
- In office 1 July 1985 – 5 June 1987

Personal details
- Born: 5 October 1927 Melbourne, Victoria, Australia
- Died: 22 September 2016 (aged 88)
- Party: Democrats (1981–86); Independent (1986–87); Unite Australia (1987)
- Occupation: Businessman

John Royston Siddons AO (5 October 1927 – 22 September 2016) was an Australian politician. He was a businessman and the executive chairman of Siddons Industries Ltd. before entering politics.

== Early life ==
Siddons was born in Melbourne on 5 October 1927. He was the second of three children born to Agnes Emily (née Smith) and Royston Siddons. His father was an industrialist who founded the Sidchrome line of tools.

Siddons spent his early years in the suburb of Ivanhoe, attending Ivanhoe State School and Preston Technical School. He completed his secondary education at Wesley College from 1943 to 1945, but did not matriculate as he had always intended on joining his father's business.

== Business career ==
In 1945, Siddons began working for one of his father's firms, Siddons Drop Forging Pty Ltd, drop forging hammers at its factory in Clifton Hill. He was groomed to take over the business and worked across all departments of his father's conglomerate, starting at factory level to gain an understanding of manual labour.

Siddons was sent to the United States on a research tour in 1949, where he was introduced to the newly created Ramset gun – "a powder-actuated tool gun that greatly sped up the process of fastening slabs of concrete or steel". He acquired the Australian franchise rights and in 1952 incorporated Ramset Fasteners (Australia) Pty Ltd as a division of Siddons Drop Forging, with himself as general manager. Due to import restrictions the firm had to manufacture Ramset guns in Australia, quickly ramping up production and later establishing subsidiaries in New Zealand and South Africa. By 1955 profits from the Ramset line had surpassed the rest of the Siddons' tool-making divisions.

== Politics ==
Siddons' first involvement in politics was through the Australia Party. He was an unsuccessful candidate for the party at three federal elections, standing for the House of Representatives in the seat of Diamond Valley at the 1972 election and for the Senate at the 1974 and 1975 elections. He was elected to succeed Gordon Barton as national convenor of the Australia Party in December 1974, defeating Ian Gilfillan.

In 1980, he was elected to the Australian Senate as a Democrats senator for Victoria. He was defeated at the 1983 election, when he was required to take second place on the Democrats ticket in deference to party leader Don Chipp. He was, however, re-elected in the 1984 election, when seven places were up for election due to the expansion of the Parliament. In 1986, he left the Democrats, claiming that the party had moved too far to the left. In 1987, he registered the Unite Australia Party, amalgamating two other minor parties, the Advance Australia Party and the remnants of the Australia Party. He was joined in the Senate by South Australian Democrat David Vigor. The new party contested the 1987 election but received under 1% in all states contested. Siddons and Vigor were both defeated.

He died in 2016, aged 88.
