= Stanley New Britain plant =

- Operated: 1843–2026
- Location: 600 Myrtle Street; New Britain, Connecticut, United States
- Coordinates: 41°40′9″N 72°48′3″W
- Industry: Hand tools
- Products: tape measures
- Employees: 300 (2026)
- Area: 47 acres (19 ha)
- Volume: 2,000,000 square feet (190,000 m^{2})
- Owner: Stanley Black & Decker

Stanley New Britain plant was an tape measure manufacturing plant in New Britain, Connecticut owned by Stanley Black & Decker. The plant produces 30 million single-sided tape measures a year (such as traditional PowerLock models) and was closed in 2026.

== History ==
In July 1997, The Stanley Works announced a major global restructuring under newly appointed CEO John M. Trani, which involved cutting 4,500 jobs worldwide. In its hometown of New Britain, Connecticut, the overhaul resulted in the elimination of 260 hourly blue-collar hardware-making jobs.

In 2001 and 2002, Stanley Works eliminated 1,200 jobs in its Hardware Division in New Britain, Connecticut. The company moved these manufacturing operations offshore to lower costs in China and Mexico.

In December 2008, Stanley Works announced plans to cut 2,000 jobs globally—about 10 percent of its workforce—and close three manufacturing facilities due to a weak global economy and declining construction markets, which impacted operations and workers at its historic New Britain plant.

In February 2026, Stanley Black & Decker announced it will close its final manufacturing plant in New Britain, Connecticut, and will laid off approximately 300 workers at the plant, as demand for US-made single-sided tape measures declined in favor of double-sided tape measures made in Thailand. The plant closed on May 18, 2026, ending 183 years of continuous manufacturing history in the city.
