= PIH =

PIH can refer to:

- Partners In Health, health organization
- Permanent income hypothesis, economic model
- Phenylisopropylhydrazine
- Postinflammatory hyperpigmentation, skin condition
- PIH Health (formerly Presbyterian Intercommunity Hospital), hospital in Whittier, California
- Pipeline Induction Heat (PIH), coating provider for oil and gas pipelines
- Pitkern language, ISO 639-3 code
- Pocatello Regional Airport, Bannock County, Idaho
- Pregnancy-induced hypertension
