= Serta (company) =

Mattress manufacturer

- Type: Subsidiary
- Industry: Furnishings
- Founded: 1931; 95 years ago
- Founder: 13 mattress manufacturers
- Headquarters: Doraville, Georgia, U.S.
- Products: Bedding
- Parent: Serta Simmons Bedding, LLC
- Website: serta.com

Serta is an American mattress brand and manufacturer. It is part of Serta Simmons Bedding, which consolidated its North American operations at a headquarters in Doraville, Georgia, in 2019.

== History ==
The company was founded in 1931 in Illinois as Sleeper, Inc. by 13 mattress manufacturers who licensed the Serta name. Subsequently, eight independent licensees acting like a cooperative owned the company. Afterwards, it was controlled and operated as Serta International by its largest licensee, National Bedding Company, which ultimately held 27 of the 34 U.S. Serta manufacturing licenses.

In 2005 the Los Angeles private equity firm Ares Management and Teachers' Private Capital, the private equity arm of the Ontario Teachers' Pension Plan, acquired National Bedding Company. Ares had held a minority stake since 2003, and Goldman Sachs led a $570 million financing package for the purchase. The two firms completed the purchase of Simmons in January 2010, after Simmons emerged from a pre-packaged Chapter 11 restructuring that cut its debt from about $1 billion to about $450 million. Serta and Simmons continued to operate as separate businesses with their own management. In August 2012 Advent International agreed to acquire a majority interest in AOT Bedding Super Holdings, the parent of both brands, with Ares and Ontario Teachers' retaining a significant stake.

Serta International is a subsidiary of Serta Simmons Bedding, LLC. Other licensees include Serta Dormae in Texas, Serta Restokraft in Michigan, and Salt Lake Mattress in Utah.

In August 2018, Serta Simmons Bedding, LLC announced a merger with online retailer Tuft & Needle.

In May 2019 Serta Simmons Bedding opened a consolidated North American headquarters in Doraville, Georgia, on the site of a former General Motors assembly plant outside Atlanta. The campus brought together four U.S. offices and around 500 staff, including about 80 employees from the Chicago area, where the Serta brand had been based.

On January 23, 2023, Serta Simmons Bedding filed for Chapter 11 bankruptcy. It emerged from Chapter 11 on June 29, 2023, having cut its funded debt from $1.9 billion to $315 million.

Chief executive Shelley Huff, who led the company through the restructuring, left about a month after it exited bankruptcy, and her successor Charlie Eitel resigned three months into the job. Board chairman Mark Genender served as interim chief executive until Jim Loree took the post on July 1, 2024, the fourth person to hold it in less than a year. Loree had been chief executive of Stanley Black & Decker from 2016 to 2022 and was already a member of the Serta Simmons board. Cesar Perez became chief financial officer a week later.

== Products ==
Serta produces four main types of mattresses: traditional inner spring, gel-infused memory foam, hybrid mattresses which combine both, and Talalay latex, which is produced at the Salt Lake City plant. Serta products are used in the hospitality industry, with Hilton Worldwide and Wyndham Worldwide among its customers.

== See also ==
- Bedding
- Bed
- Futon
