= Stanley Odd Jobs =

Stanley No. 1 "Odd Jobs"
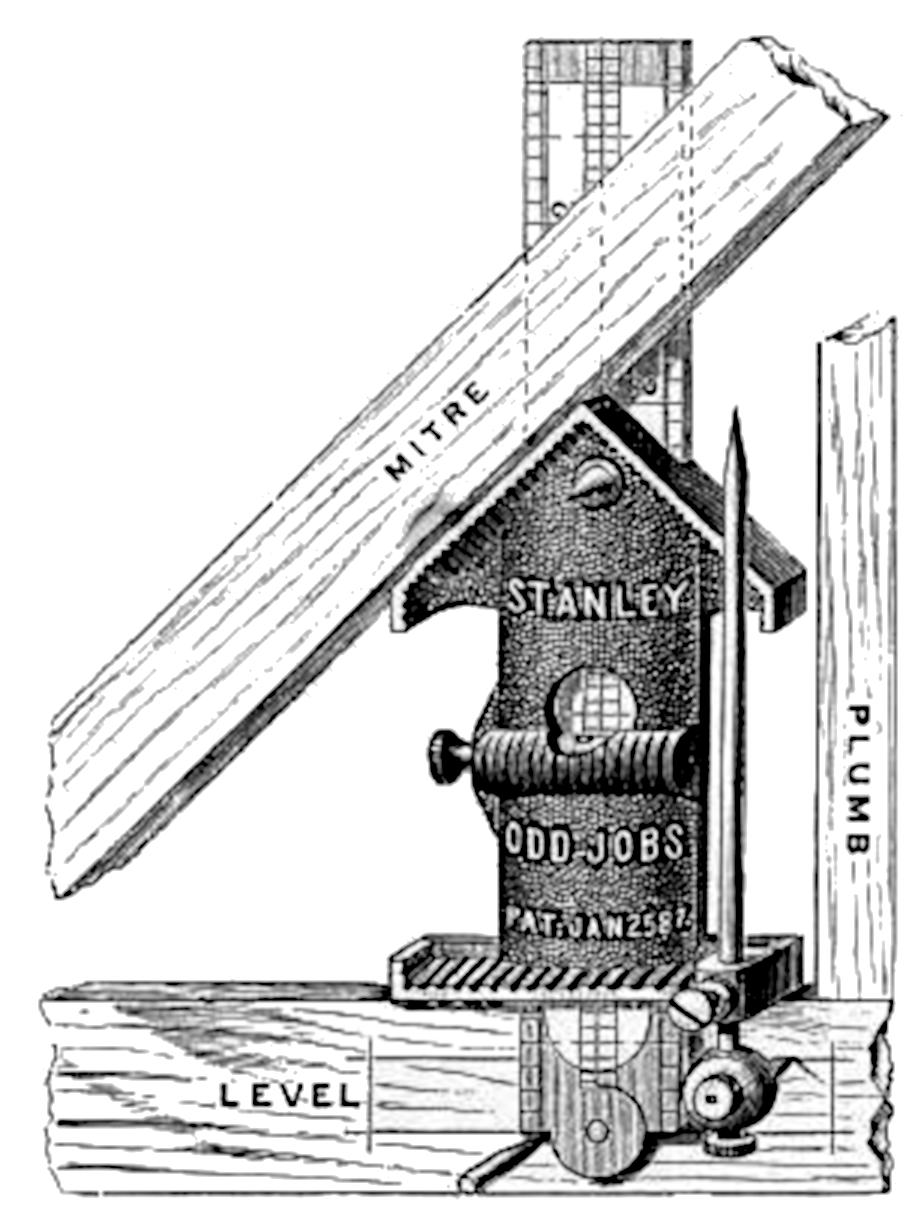
- Illustration of Stanley's "Odd Jobs" from their 1892 catalogue.
- Other names: Odd Job
- Classification: Woodworking hand tool
- Inventor: George F. Hall
- Manufacturer: The Stanley Rule and Level Company
- Model: No.1

The Stanley No. 1 Odd Jobs was a tool produced by the Stanley Works from 1888 to the 1930s. It combined features of sundry tools, in a single pocketable tool, including:

- Try square
- Mitre square
- T-square
- Marking gauge
- Mortise gauge
- Depth gauge
- Mitre level
- Spirit level and plumb
- Beam compass
- Inside square
- Ruler (a separate part used to enable many of the above functions. Often a four fold rule, trimmed in brass, was used)

The name Odd Jobs denotes that the tool does many kinds of sundry tool roles. Its closest cousin among common, modern tools, is the combination square, which shares with the Odd Job the functions of scribing, squaring, level/plumb, and the sliding and locking ruler (originally a 12 inch wooden ruler with a built-in trammel point was included with units bundled with a ruler, but this was often changed and many are found with a steel rule, or a brass-bound four-fold rule --- the Garret Wade reproduction uses a brass bound wooden ruler). However, the Odd Jobs still has some unique functions in its total package, including the compass, and compensated gauging.

== Development ==
The Odd Jobs was developed by George F. Hall of Long Branch, New Jersey, and patented by him, filing on 7 May 1866, and receiving patent No. 356 533 on 25 January 1887. This patent date can be seen on early examples "PATJAN2587" across the width of the tool.

== Production and availability ==
The OddJobs was produced by Stanley from 1887/8 to 1935. It came in a cardboard box with instruction leaflet. It could be combined with any suitable one inch wooden rule, notably the Stanley four fold boxwood and brass rule. The device was nickel coated, and earlier versions could take a pencil. It weighed 10 ounces (280 g). The price changed with time, but prices include 75 cents and $1.10.

Stanley ceased production of the Odd Jobs in 1935, the Garrett Wade tool company revived the tool in 1996, and currently produces Odd Jobs according to the original Stanley design, in two different sizes. It was also available from Harbor Freight and Rockler. Woodpeckers has produced it as a one time tool twice now.

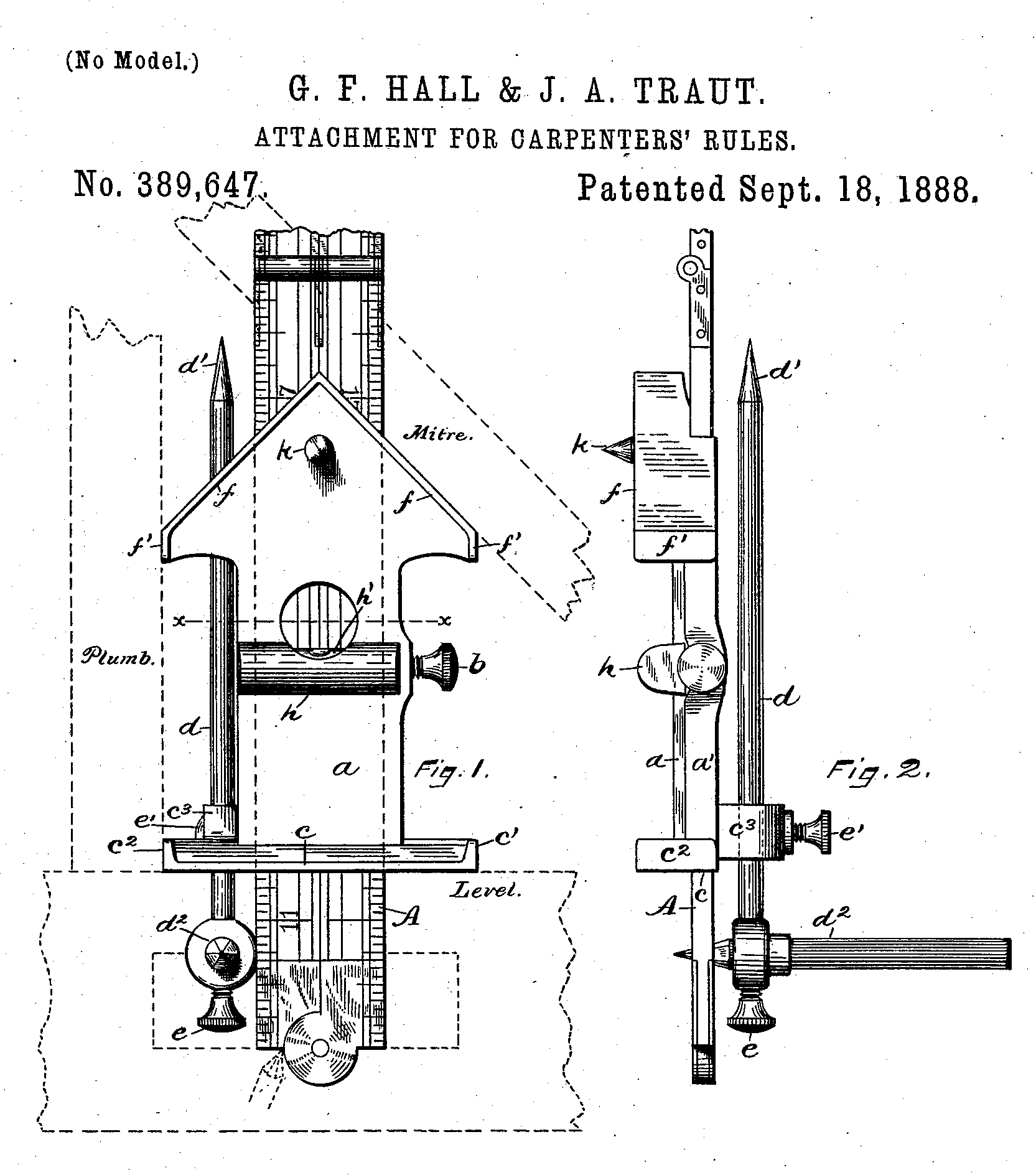
Drawings of G.F. Hall's 1888 Odd Jobs patent

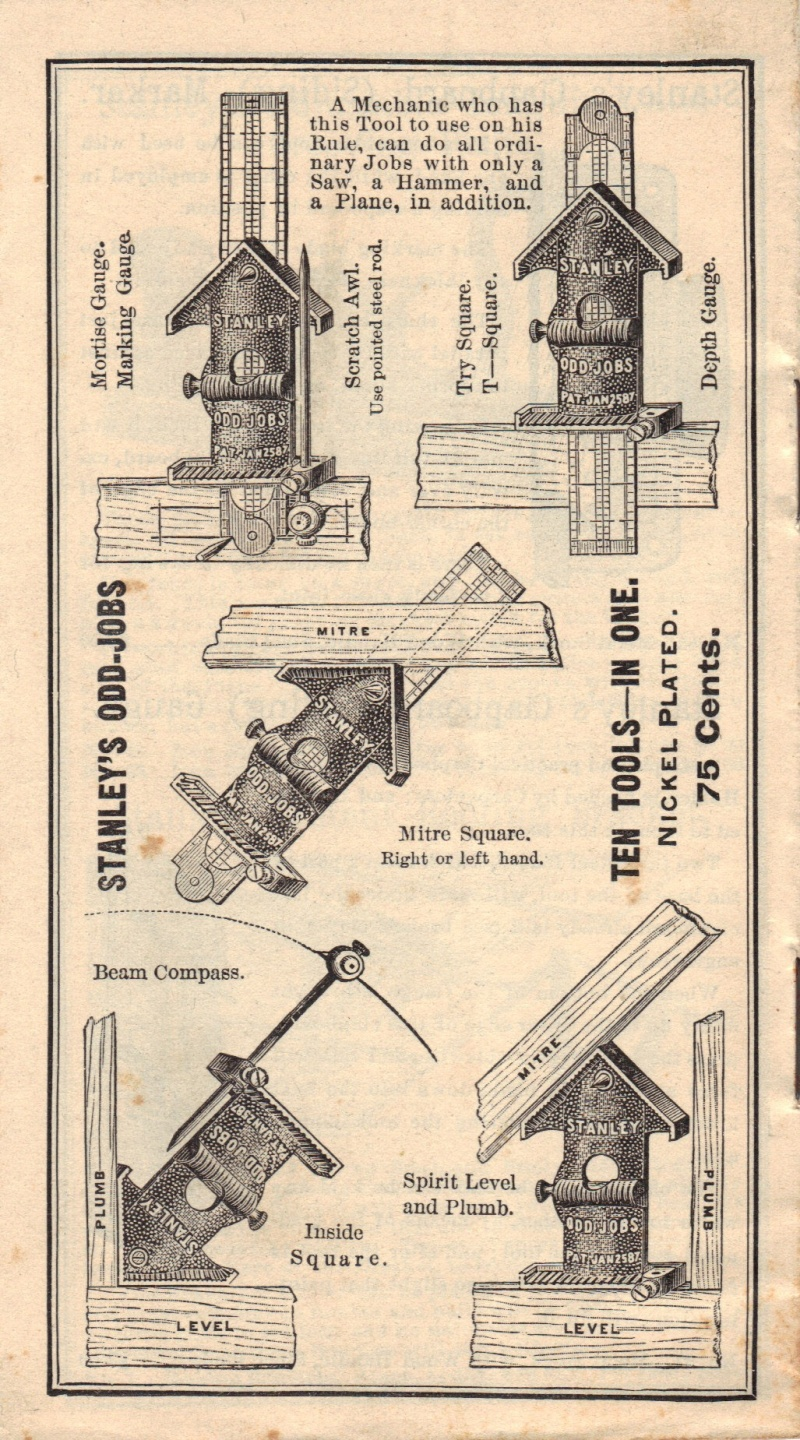
Page from Stanley's 1892 pocket catalogue demonstrating some of the tool's uses.
