= Siddon =

Siddon is a surname. Notable people with the surname include:

- Tom Siddon, Canadian politician
- Mary Siddon, English thief

== See also ==
- Siddons
