= John F. Lundgren =

American businessman (born 1951)

- Born: September 1951 (age 74); Braintree, Massachusetts, United States
- Education: Dartmouth College, Stanford University
- Occupation: Businessman
- Known for: Former CEO and chairman of Stanley Black & Decker
- Spouse: Tamara Lundgren (m. 2005)

John F. Lundgren (born September 1951) is an American businessman most notable as the former CEO and chairman of Stanley Black & Decker.

== Early life and education ==
Lundgren was born in Braintree, Massachusetts. He is a graduate of Dartmouth College where he was the captain of the golf team. He received his MBA from Stanford University.

== Career ==
Lundgren became 1995 the President of European Consumer Products at James River Corporation and held that position until 1997. In 1997 he became the President of European Consumer Products for Fort James Corporation. In January 2001 he was the President of European Consumer Products at Georgia-Pacific which he held until February 2004.

On March 1, 2004, he was made the Chairman of Stanley Black & Decker until March 12, 2010, when he was made the President. He was again named chairman from March 13, 2013. This meant he was CEO or chairman of Stanley Black & Decker from March 1, 2004, through July 31, 2016.

In 2010, he was one of the highest paid CEOs, with compensation of $32.6 million that year.

== Board memberships ==
Lundgren is a member of the board of directors of the National Association of Manufacturers (NAM). He has been a director of Topgolf Callaway Brands since 2009.

In 2023, Lundgren was named of Chairman of Visa Inc.

== Personal life ==
Lundgren is married to Tamara Lundgren, CEO of Radius Recycling. In August 2005, they were married at The Berkeley in London.
