= Frederick Trent Stanley =

American industrialist

1st Mayor of New Britain
- In office 1871–1872
- Succeeded by: Samuel Waldo Hart

Personal details
- Born: August 12, 1802 New Britain, Connecticut, U.S.
- Died: August 2, 1883 (aged 80)
- Party: Republican
- Spouse: Melvinia Chamberlain (m. 1838; died 1843)
- Children: 3

Frederick Trent Stanley (August 12, 1802 – August 2, 1883) was an American industrialist born in New Britain, Connecticut. He was the city's first mayor, following its incorporation in 1871.

== Early life, family and education ==
Frederick Stanley had at least one brother, William.

== Career ==
After his schooling, Stanley worked in New Haven, Connecticut, and Fayetteville, North Carolina, before returning to New Britain in 1826. He held several positions, including as a clerk on steamboats and in general stores. Stanley was involved in a number of New Britain businesses, including a machine manufacturer for the growing iron business in Hartford, Connecticut, the state capital. With the investment flourishing, Frederick and his brother William purchased the remainder of that business and decided to expand. After four years the pair invested in a brass foundry named Stanley Woodruff & Company.

As early as 1842 the Stanleys began business, ultimately opening Stanley Bolt Manufacturing. The company manufactured bolts, hinges, and other hardware from wrought iron. When Frederick wanted to expand the manufacture of hinges, he started a separate company, the Stanley Works, which was incorporated in 1853. In 1920, the company merged with the Stanley Rule and Level Company (also of New Britain), founded by his cousin Henry Stanley in 1857, with Stanley Rule & Level becoming the tool division of the Stanley Works.

When starting out as a hardware manufacturer Stanley traveled throughout Connecticut, selling and often installing the hardware he made. Not long after the Stanley Works was incorporated, Frederick hired William Hart, who grew the Stanley Works into the powerhouse it was to become. Some of his innovations were improving packaging of hardware to speed up sales, the invention of cold rolling steel and improving processes and developing machinery to increase production while reducing expenses.

== Politics and civic work ==
Stanley served as both the first warden of New Britain in 1850 and its first mayor following its incorporation in 1871. During his term, he brought gas lighting, rail service, and a reservoir-fed water supply to the town.

== Personal life ==
On July 4, 1838, Stanley married Melvinia Chamberlain. They had three sons: Alfred Hubert, Frederick Henry, and William Chamberlain. Melvinia died at age 28 from scarlet fever, and the two youngest boys died shortly thereafter.

Following the deaths of his wife and two of his children, Frederick moved in with his brother, William, who was also his business partner.

Stanley died on August 2, 1883, at age 80, ten days short of his 81st birthday.

== Legacy ==
Stanley is one of the world's most recognized brands of tools today, and they have produced millions of hand planes, saws, rulers, try squares, chisels, screwdrivers, and many other tools for consumer and industrial use. Their innovations include the Bailey hand plane, the Surform shaper, the PowerLock tape measure, and the box-cutter knife (utility knife).

In 2010 Stanley Works merged with Black and Decker to become Stanley Black & Decker.

- After bringing the railroad to New Britain in 1850, the first locomotive to come through town was named the Frederick T. Stanley.
- Frederick Stanley sent a pair of suspenders from one of his businesses to President Andrew Jackson. In return, he received a hand written letter of thanks signed by the President himself.
- A utility knife is often referred to as a Stanley knife.
