= LISTA =

Swiss furniture manufacturer

LISTA AG

- LISTA headquarters in Erlen, Switzerland
- Industry: Manufacturing
- Founded: Switzerland (1945)
- Founder: Alfred Lienhard
- Headquarters: Erlen, Thurgau, Switzerland
- Products: Workshop furniture and storage systems
- Website: www.lista.com

LISTA (also known as LISTA Group, formally LISTA AG) is a Swiss-based manufacturer of furniture for workshops and warehouses. The company's products include cabinets, shelving, work surfaces, and benches, as well as equipment for materials and parts handling.

== History ==
The company originated in a workshop founded by Alfred Lienhard in 1945 in Herisau. Early products included chairs and tables made of steel tube. An attempt to diversify into appliances by manufacturing refrigerators was not successful and resulted in Lienhard focusing on storage systems for workshops.

By 1951, the company moved to a factory in Erlen in April of that year. Two years later, the name LISTA was first used; the factory briefly produced mopeds, finishing approximately six hundred over several months, but found it was unable to compete with foreign motorbike manufacturers and moped production was stopped. The company was successively named Lienhard Stahlbau (1952), Lienhard AG (1967), and Lista Holding AG (1980).

After 1960 the company expanded into an enterprise producing in Switzerland—including at Dozwil (1960–1995), Degersheim (from 1980), and Arnegg (from 1989)—as well as in the United States and Germany.

LISTA Museum at Lista Office, in Degersheim, Switzerland

In 1970, Alfred Lienhard suffered a heart attack and control of LISTA was transferred to his son, Fredy Lienhard. Fredy continued to expand international business, particularly in the United States, purchasing their partner Deluxe. Over the next few years, offices and warehouses were established in Holliston, Massachusetts, Dallas, Texas, and Long Beach, California. In 1972, Deluxe-LISTA became the LISTA International Corporation.

In 2004, the group was divided into two divisions: office furniture systems (Lienhard Office Group AG) and industrial and warehouse equipment (Lista Holding AG). While the office furniture business initially remained under the ownership of the Lienhard family, a new ownership structure was established for the internationally oriented industrial and warehouse equipment division.

In 2006, the Swiss investment company Capvis acquired a majority stake in Lista Holding AG. Management retained a stake of approximately ten percent, while Fredy Lienhard remained a significant minority shareholder. In 2012, Stanley Black & Decker completed the acquisition of Lista North America.

In June 2018, Capvis sold its majority stake in the Lista Group to the Chinese GreatStar Group. At that time, Lista employed around 500 people and produced operating and storage systems at locations in Switzerland, Germany and Italy.

The family business was among the largest employers in the canton of Thurgau, with 228 employees in 1958; 1,836 employees and a turnover of 360 million francs in 1989; and about 1,100 employees in 2004, of whom 700 were in Erlen, with a turnover of 245 million francs.

Swiss Airlines worker in a LISTA moped, 1950's

== Operations ==
LISTA develops and manufactures storage, workplace and operational equipment for industrial and commercial applications. Its product range includes conventional storage and workplace equipment as well as automated storage systems. The company offers both standardized products and configurable solutions for workshops, production facilities and warehouses.

LISTA's first drawer cabinet, produced in 1951

=== Products and systems ===
LISTA manufactures storage and workplace equipment for industrial and commercial applications. Its product range includes drawer cabinets, workbenches, workstation systems, shelving systems, storage cabinets and material storage solutions. Many of these products are based on modular systems that allow individual components to be combined into workplace or storage configurations.

The company's manufacturing activities include the production and assembly of industrial storage and workplace equipment. Its manufacturing operations support both standardized product ranges and customer-specific configurations.

LISTA automated vertical storage system

=== Production and facilities ===
LISTA manufactures its products at two production sites in Switzerland and Germany. The company's headquarters and a principal manufacturing site are located in Erlen in the canton of Thurgau, Switzerland. In Germany, production is carried out by Lista GmbH in Bergneustadt, North Rhine-Westphalia.

Production site in Erlen, Switzerland

=== International presence and distribution ===
LISTA sells its products internationally through its own sales organizations and a network of specialist retail partners. In addition to its headquarters and production facilities in Switzerland and Germany, the company maintains sales operations in several European markets, including France, Italy, Austria, Spain, the Czech Republic and the United Kingdom. According to the company, its international dealer and sales network cover more than 60 countries. The company's sales are primarily directed towards commercial and institutional customers.

LISTA Production site and offices in Bergneustadt, Germany

=== Markets and applications ===
LISTA's products are primarily used in industrial and commercial environments. Major application areas include mechanical engineering, metalworking, automotive manufacturing and repair, aviation, healthcare, maintenance operations and industrial production. The company's storage and workplace systems are also used by public-sector and institutional customers.

Planning and product configuration are also increasingly supported by digital tools. Customers and distribution partners can configure various workplace and storage systems using online configurators.

LISTA Electronic Control-cabinet

=== Automatization and digitalization ===
In May 2026, the company introduced the LISTA AI Sales Assistant, an AI-supported tool integrated with its online product configurator. The assistant supports product searches, spare part identification and technical enquiries.
