= Robomow =

Manufacturer of robotic lawn mowers

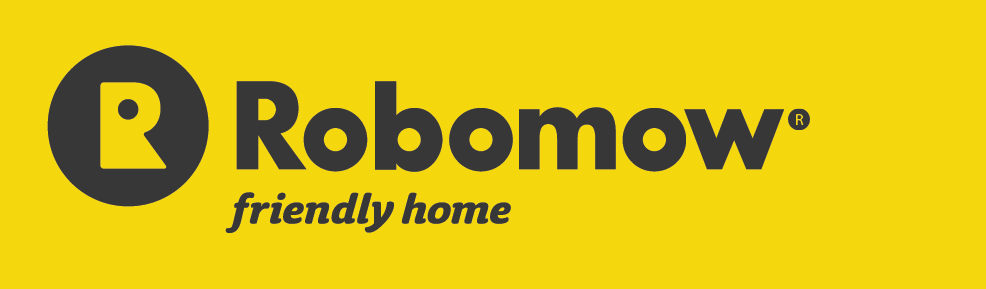
- Type: Private
- Industry: Robots
- Founded: 1995; 31 years ago
- Founder: Udi Peless and Shai Abramson
- Headquarters: Israel
- Area served: United States, Europe
- Products: robotic lawn mowers
- Website: www.robomow.com

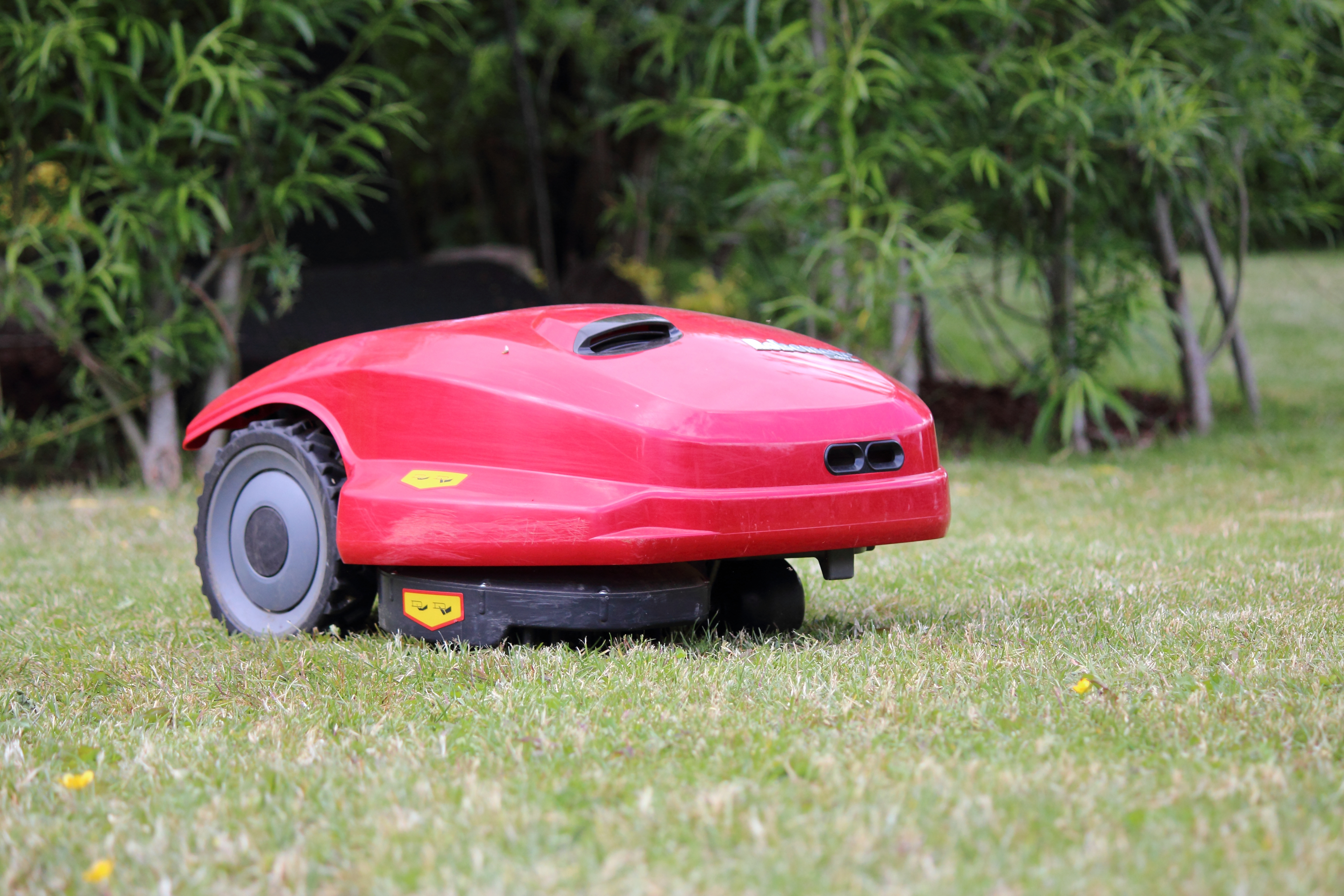
A Robomow City 110 manufactured by Friendly Robotics in action in a garden in Denmark.

Robomow (also known as Friendly Robotics) is a manufacturer of robotic lawn mowers. Founded in Even Yehuda, Israel, in 1995 by Udi Peless and Shai Abramson, the company provides robotic lawnmowers to the United States and Europe, with prices ranging from hundreds to thousands of dollars/Euros. Robomow mowers are rechargeable. Robomow also comes with its own mobile application for remote and interactive control. In May 2017, MTD Products Inc. announced its intent to purchase Friendly Robotics. In July 2017, MTD Products announced the completion of the purchase of Robomow.

== History ==
=== Robotic Lawn Mowers ===
Robomow was originally named ‘Friendly Machines’ to construct robots that will, as Udi Peless says in Space Daily, "move in and around the home, doing the mundane tasks that people do not like to do anymore".

The Robomow Classic model was launched for sale in 1998, selling approximately 4000 units between 1998 and 2001.

The company name was changed to Friendly Robotics in 1999.

In 2000, the second generation of robotic mowers arrived: the Robomow ‘RL’ platform. Compared to the Robomow Classic, Robomow RL was more advanced, smaller, lighter and significantly more user-friendly. Further enhancements included the Base Station, enabling users to create a periodic lawn mowing program.

In 2008, the Robomow ‘RM’ product line made its debut as the third generation of robotic lawn mowers. Smaller, lighter and an improved version of the RL line, RM was designed specifically for the smaller lawn, which up until now, had been largely ignored.

In 2011, Robomow introduced its ‘RED’ Robomow line, a younger and slightly lower cost version of the successful RL and RM models. These models were and still are sold at DIY and Consumer Electronics chains, as well as on the Internet.

In 2013, the Robomow ‘RS’ product line was introduced, the fourth generation of robotic mowers.

In 2014, Robomow introduced its fifth generation of robotic mowers: its ‘RC’ models. These mowers were designed for lawns of up to 1200 m^{2} and are programmable via the Robomow App.

=== Robotic Vacuum Cleaners ===
In 2002, Hoover and Friendly Robotics announced a strategic alliance for developing robotic vacuum cleaners. By 2004, the first model, Friendly Vac RV400, was on the market. Weighing in at 23 pounds, it is the largest robotic cleaner of all time. However, this line of products was discontinued, and the company now focuses only on robotic lawn mowers.

== Mowing ==
All current Robomow models can mow grass inside a specified area by staying within an underground, electrified wire. The wire is installed around the mowing area by hammering it in with pegs just below the surface. Grass soon covers the wire so that it is not visible. Where areas within the specified area are not to be mowed, 'islands' can be created by keeping two strands of the electrified wire together and creating internal areas.

The mowing that Robomow does is directed in accordance with its movement algorithm, which is not straight up and down. Therefore, although no traditional mowing lines can be seen, Robomow covers the entire mowing zone within a few operations. In between mows, the mower's batteries are recharged at its docking/charging station, which it returns to automatically.
