= Best Lock Corporation =

Lock manufacturer

- Company type: Public
- Industry: lock manufacturer
- Founded: 1925
- Headquarters: Indianapolis, IN, United States
- Key people: Frank E Best, Founder, deceased
- Parent: Dormakaba
- Website: www.bestaccess.com

Best Lock Corporation was an American publicly traded door hardware and lock manufacturer. Founded in 1925 as Best Universal Lock Company by Frank Ellison Best, the privately held company relocated from Seattle, Washington, to Indianapolis, Indiana, in 1938, where operations expanded and evolved. Product offerings are now marketed under the Best Access brand, which is one of several trademarked corporate divisions in Stanley Black & Decker's Stanley Security group.

== Overview ==
In addition to its associated commercial and architectural primary hardware components - such as locksets, padlocks, specialty locks and accessories - Best Access is primarily known for its "small format" interchangeable cores, which were introduced under Frank Best's direction in the 1960s as a replacement for the removable core keying configuration that he had first developed in 1919.

Best Access products are sold primarily and directly to corporate and institutional end users without locksmith and wholesaler access to competitive distribution. Its products are typically marketed toward and installed into moderately sized or larger master key systems.

From the several keyways that Best markets, one product line, known as their Premium Key System, features a series of key sections of more substantial girth relative to most common industry types. Best held patents on the overall shape of these keys until Ilco-Unican Corporation (now Kaba-Ilco) ascertained that the patents were invalid and produced its own compatible blanks, which were first distributed with great interest at a 1993 ALOA convention.

== Current Best companies ==
Frank Best had created several companies for a number of inventions. Frank E. Best, Inc. held the original patents, while Best Universal Lock Corporation was licensed to manufacture and sell the products. Best Lock Corporation was established later to manufacture and sell a new tubular lockset called the 10K. Over time, the roles of these three companies changed. Frank E. Best, Inc. became, in effect, a holding company above Best Universal Lock Corporation, which in turn, controlled Best Lock Corporation which manufactured and sold the Best line of products.

Frank Best's oldest son, Walter Best, owned the majority shares of the three Best companies and served as President from 1966 through 1994 and it was during his tenure that the full line of mechanical lock hardware was developed.

Russell Best, grandson of Frank Best, acquired Best Lock Corporation in May 1994 from his father, Walter Best. He changed the name of Best Lock Corporation in November, 1997 to Best Access Systems. On November 25, 2002, all holdings of Russell Best, who had acquired all the outstanding stock of the minority shareholders of the three businesses in 1997 in "a legally challenged transaction", were purchased by Stanley Black & Decker. The company became Stanley Security Solutions, but still doing business as Best Access Systems.

In 2005, family members of those that Russell Best had ousted from the original company began a new enterprise - Marshall Best Security - in the same Indianapolis community and producing the same types of interchangeable cores and related commercial hardware.

== Competitive challenges ==
Best Universal Lock unsuccessfully sued Falcon lock claiming patent and trademark infringements on its 1960s core redesign. The focus of the suit was primarily on the use of Best cores in housings by Falcon or by any other manufacturer, which Best Universal Lock contended was illegal; however, since housings were not specifically identified in any patent documentation, the courts decided that there could be no infringement. Subsequently, Falcon was able to continue to produce housings and develop its own very similar core line to compete with Best Universal Lock.

Best unsuccessfully sued Ilco claiming patents infringements over their key blade design and utility patents. Ilco counterclaimed that the patents were not valid. In August 1996, court decided that both patents were invalid on basis that its utility patent was already covered in a prior art and that keyway shape was not an ornamental concern for the users.
