= MTD Holdings =

American manufacturer of outdoor power equipment

MTD Products Inc.

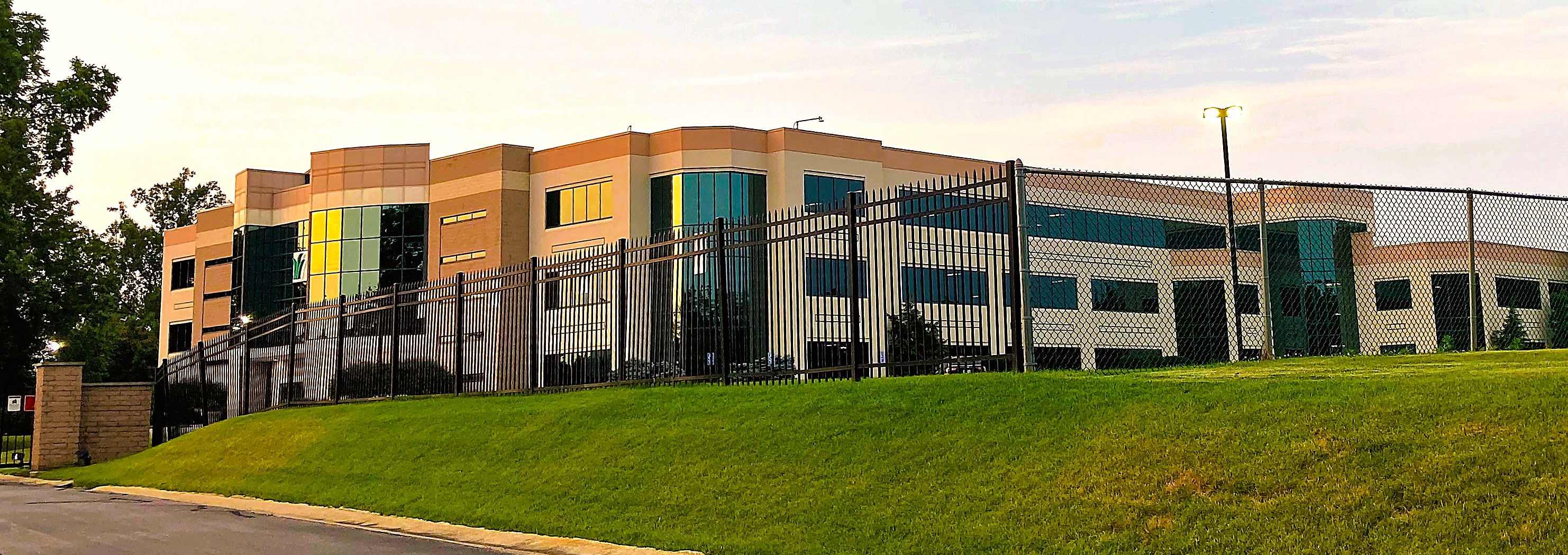
- Headquarters in Valley City, Ohio
- Type: Subsidiary
- Industry: Lawn maintenance Tree care Landscape maintenance
- Founded: 1932; 94 years ago
- Headquarters: Valley City, Ohio, U.S.
- Key people: Rob Moll, CEO
- Products: Consumer and Commercial Lawn equipment Groundskeeping equipment
- Revenue: $1.961 billion USD (2015)
- Number of employees: 6,800 (as of 2006)
- Parent: Stanley Black & Decker
- Divisions: Cub Cadet, Craftsman, Troy-Bilt, Remington, Robomow, Rover, Wolf-Garten, Columbia, Yard Machines, Bolens
- Website: MTD Parts

Modern Tool & Die, sometimes referred to as MTD Products is an American manufacturer of outdoor power equipment for the mass market. Headquartered in Valley City, Ohio, the company began in 1932 and is a wholly owned subsidiary of Stanley Black & Decker. Prior to its acquisition by Stanley Black & Decker in December 2021, MTD Products was a majority family-owned, private company. It originated as a tool and die maker. MTD's main competitors are Ariens, Briggs & Stratton, Husqvarna, John Deere, Stiga, Stihl, and The Toro Company.

Over the years, MTD acquired the Troy-Bilt, Bolens, Cub Cadet, Craftsman (owned by its minority partner), and Yard-Man brands and companies. MTD Craftsman mowers utilize the Sears "247" model prefix.

== MTD bicycles ==
Starting in 1966, MTD released their line of bicycles that were sold throughout the U.S. These bicycles were mostly muscle bikes and in 1969 they released a chopper, the MTD SS5 Chopper which merged Columbia and MTD. Both brands were strong players in the high-rise bicycle market, eventually they would join forces in the coming years; eventually the bicycle brand MTD would fade out while Columbia would continue.

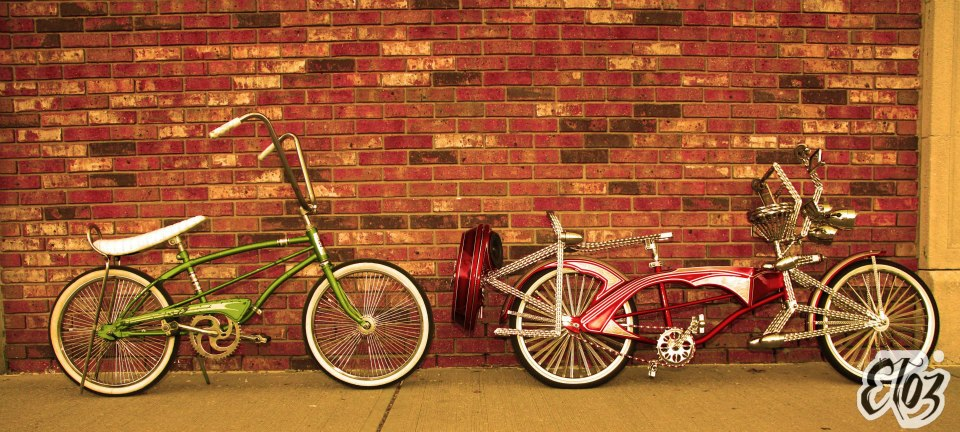
The green bicycle is a stock MTD The King; the red bicycle is a lowrider built using the frame. Muscle bicycles are often used for lowrider bicycles due to their style.

== Timeline ==
Theo Moll, Emil Jochum and Erwin Gerhard formed a partnership to purchase the assets of Modern Tool and Die Company located on Power Avenue in Cleveland. The initial capital investment was $4,500. MTD's first products were perforating dies and a rolling machine for making window channels for Standard Products. MTD employed 12 employees in 1933. By 1934 there were 60 employees.

In 1936 the company produced its first automotive stampings products, grilles for Graham-Paige automobiles.

In 1952 the controlling interest in Midwest Industries Inc. was purchased. With this MTD began to manufacture pedal bikes, velocipedes, kiddie cars and playground equipment.

In 1954 MTD entered the garden equipment industry with its introduction of a line of wheelbarrows.

In 1958 MTD entered the lawn and garden power equipment industry with the production of an 18-inch (46 cm) power rotary mower.

In 1959 MTD began manufacturing self-propelled lawn mowers, garden tractors and other power equipment.

In 1962 MTD purchased Sehl Engineering Ltd. of Canada which would later become MTD Products, Ltd. and then MTD Canada.

In 1966 MTD purchased Industrial Plastics Company in Cleveland.

In 1967 MTD started to manufacture bicycles.

In 1968 MTD started snow thrower production. At the same time Yard-Man buys George Garden Tools.

In 1975 MTD purchased the Yard-Man name from Montgomery Ward.

In 1980 MTD built its 160,000 sq ft (15,000 m^{2}) manufacturing plant in Brownsville, Tennessee (now defunct).

In 1981 the Cub Cadet product line was acquired from International Harvester, and the White Outdoor Products Company was acquired from the old White Motor Company.

In 1985 the company's Martin, Tennessee plant began operation, and Arnold Corporation was acquired.

In 1986 Aircap Industries in Tupelo, Mississippi was acquired.

In 1994 MTD built the Modern Transmission Development Company plant in Leitchfield, Kentucky.

In 1996 a joint venture with Lesco created Commercial Turf Products.

In 2000, a Hungarian manufacturing facility was opened with expanded capacity for electrical products. MTD acquired Ryobi Limited's North America outdoor products business, giving them the capacity to produce 1.5 million engines and related hand-held garden products.

In 2001, MTD acquired Garden Way including the Troy-Bilt and Bolens brands.

In 2003, MTD's Ryobi Outdoor Power equipment division ceased manufacturing products under the Ryobi brand name and sold the rights to the use of the Ryobi brand name for the manufacture and sale of outdoor products to Ryobi Tools/TTI

In 2006, MTD began building lawn equipment under the fmc brand for sale in Europe.

In 2007, MTD began building the low-end lawn and garden tractors for its otherwise competitor, Toro.

In 2008, MTD began having a third-party company (located in China) manufacture a new line of engines for the Craftsman 2008 line of snowthrowers. They are no longer building them with Tecumseh engines.

In 2009 MTD acquired the brand Remington Chainsaws from Desa International.

In 2010 MTD (Australia) acquired the brand Rover Mowers from GWA International Limited.

In 2017 MTD acquired Robomow, a.k.a. "Friendly Robotics".

In September 2018, New Britain, Conn.-based power tool maker Stanley Black & Decker announced that it had an agreement to acquire a 20% stake in outdoor power equipment maker MTD Products for $234 million. The transaction was expected to close in early 2019. In addition, Stanley Black & Decker had the option to acquire the remaining 80% of MTD starting July 1, 2021, which it did on August 17, 2021. Furthermore, with the acquisition of Craftsman by Stanley Black & Decker, the brand's products are now produced by MTD through this partnership.
