= LENOX Tools =

- Type: Subsidiary
- Industry: Manufacturing
- Founded: 1915
- Headquarters: East Longmeadow, Massachusetts
- Products: Hand tools, power tool accessories
- Parent: Stanley Black & Decker
- Website: www.lenoxtools.com

LENOX Tools is an American brand of hand tools, power tool accessories, and industrial band saw blades. It largely produces saws, saw blades, utility knives, snips, and other cutting tools.

The brand was founded in 1915 as the "American Saw and Manufacturing Company" by ten employees to produce hacksaw blades. In 2003, American Saw was acquired by Newell Rubbermaid. In 2017, Stanley Black & Decker purchased the tools business of Newell Brands, including Lenox.

== Gallery ==
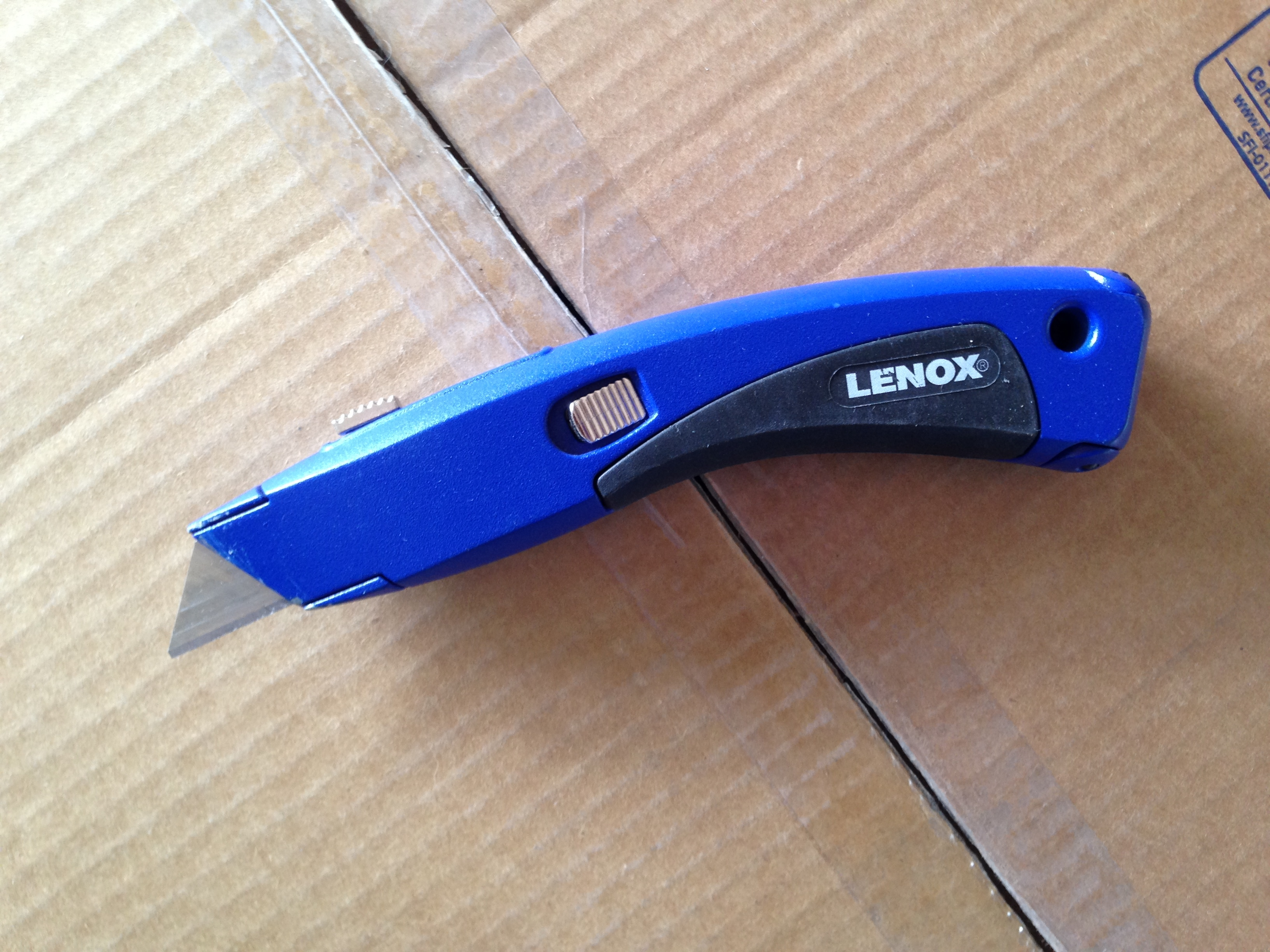
A Lenox utility knife.

== See also ==
- Lenox Industrial Tools 301—A NASCAR race formerly sponsored by the company.
