= Avdel =

British fastening technology company

Avdel UK Limited
- Industry: Fastening technology
- Founded: 1936
- Headquarters: Welwyn Garden City, United Kingdom
- Products: Blind fastening systems
- Owner: Stanley Black & Decker

Avdel is a worldwide operating company producing Blind Fastening Systems and related tools.

== Company history ==
In 1936 the company was founded by Stanley Thomas Johnson in Godalming, Surrey, United Kingdom. The business, originally called "Aviation Developments", manufactured riveting technology, including the newly invented Chobert magazine-fed rivets, primarily to the at that time growing aviation industry.

At the time aircraft construction was moving from metal and wood to all-metal structures, such as the Spitfire fighter. This required a new generation of fasteners and tools, which could be installed from one side of the assembly to replace conventional rivets.

By the 1950s the company was focusing on providing new value added assembly solutions, this "systems" approach created greater optimisation and provided customers with a single source for dependable fasteners and installation equipment.

In 1961 the company was renamed 'Avdel' and substantial growth throughout the next two decades saw it become one of the world's largest manufacturers of blind fasteners and installation tools. Expansion of the group was most significant in the 60s, 70s and 80s with several new facilities established in Europe, USA and the Asia Pacific region.

In May 1994 the group was acquired by Textron Inc. Avdel was renamed 'Avdel Textron' and the group became part of Textron Fastening Systems, an alliance of Textron owned fastening companies. In 2006 Textron Fastening Systems was sold to Platinum Equity and renamed Acument Global Technologies. Within the Acument group the Avdel brand was relaunched.

In 2010 the Acument Global Technology businesses Avdel and Global Electronics & Commercial ("GEC") were purchased by funds advised by CVC Asia Pacific Limited ("CVC"), Standard Chartered Private Equity Limited ("SCPEL") through an indirectly owned company to be renamed Infastech Limited. The newly formed corporate entity Infastech is the parent company to the brands Avdel, Elco and iForm. In 2013, Stanley Black & Decker acquired Infastech under Stanley's Engineered Fastening segment.

Avdel headquarters remain in the modern Sales, Marketing & R&D facility in Welwyn Garden City, UK with manufacturing based in Warrington, UK, and Stanfield, USA. The manufacturing sites are complemented with an extended distribution centre network in Canada, USA, UK, Spain, France, Germany and Italy. These locations are also supported by the Infastech global distribution network as well as a number of authorised distribution partners and concessionaires based all over EMEA and South America in countries like Brazil, Poland, UAE, Turkey, Denmark, Sweden, Ireland, Belgium, Finland, Switzerland, Norway and the Netherlands to name a few.

== Locations ==
- Headquarters: Welwyn Garden City (UK)
- Production facilities: Warrington (UK), Stanfield (USA)
- Distribution Centres: Canada, US, UK, Spain, France, (Germany) and Italy
