= James M. Loree =

American business executive

- Education: Union College (B.A.)
- Occupation: Businessman
- Spouse: Rebecca Corbin Loree

James "Jim" M. Loree is an American business executive who has been chief executive officer of Serta Simmons Bedding, the parent company of the mattress brands Serta and Simmons, since July 2024. He was previously president and chief executive officer of Stanley Black & Decker from August 2016 to 2022, having joined the company in 1999. The company ranked 250th on the Fortune 500 in 2017, with about $11 billion in annual revenue.

== Education ==
Jim attended Union College in Schenectady, New York. He graduated in 1980 with a B.A. in Economics. He is a member of a secret society known as the Sigma Phi Society. He is also a member of the honor and scholarship greek letter organizations Phi Beta Kappa and Omicron Delta Epsilon.

== Career ==
Jim Loree first joined Stanley Black & Decker (then Stanley Works) in 1999, serving as VP and chief financial officer with 19 years previously with General Electric Company (GE). Eventually being named EVP and CFO in 2002, EVP & chief operating officer in 2009 and President & COO in 2013 before then as President & COO (2013–2016).

Beginning in 2002, Loree began an M&A effort to transform Stanley into a growth-oriented diversified industrial company. Since then company revenues have more than quadrupled, fueled by over seventy acquisitions including the landmark merger with Black & Decker in 2010.

Loree left Stanley Black & Decker in 2022 after nearly 25 years with the company. In June 2024 Serta Simmons Bedding, the parent of the mattress brands Serta and Simmons, named him chief executive officer, effective July 1. He was already a member of its board and succeeded Mark Genender, who had been serving as interim chief executive.

Since July 2024 he has been chief executive officer of Serta Simmons Bedding, the parent company of the mattress brands Serta and Simmons.

== Board memberships ==
Jim served for over five years as a director of Harsco Corporation, including four as Audit Committee Chair. He also serves as a member of the National Association of Manufacturers, on the Wall Street Journal CEO Council, as a Business Roundtable member, a Trustee of Union College, a director of Hartford Hospital and a director of the Jim and Rebecca Loree Foundation.

== Family ==
Loree is married to Rebecca Corbin Loree, Founder & CEO of Corbin Advisors, LLC. Jim relocated to the greater Hartford, Connecticut area in 1999.
