= Sidchrome =

Australian tool company

- Type: Subsidiary
- Industry: Manufacturing
- Founded: 1942
- Founder: Royston Siddons
- Headquarters: Heidelberg West, Victoria, Australia
- Products: Hand tools
- Parent: Stanley Black & Decker
- Website: www.sidchrome.com.au

Sidchrome is an Australian brand of mechanics' tools. It is a subsidiary of Stanley Black & Decker.

== History ==
The brand emerged when Royston Siddons' Siddons Drop Forgings turned to tool making to fill post war shortages after World War II. Original production of Sidchrome tools was in Brunswick, Melbourne, Australia.

Sidchrome was acquired by Stanley Tools in 1991. Sidchrome closed the Australian factory and ended all local manufacturing. In 1996 Stanley Black & Decker started to move all tool manufacturing to Taiwan, whilst sourcing various items from Proto in the USA (marked as Proto on items) due to supply of left-over Australian-made tools being sold out until all manufacturing was fully established in Taiwan.

== Racing ==
Sidchrome sponsored several Australian and New Zealand racing drivers in the 1970s, notably New Zealand and Australian saloon champion Jim Richards.
