= CRC-Evans =

Welding and coating services provider

CRC Evans
- Type: Privately held company
- Industry: Oil & gas, Renewables, Infrastructure, Nuclear
- Area served: Worldwide
- Products: Energy and wider infrastructure
- Website: www.crcevans.com

CRC Evans provides welding and coating services and technologies to the energy and wider infrastructure sectors.

In 2022 CRC Evans was acquired by Pipeline Technique, a welding services company based in Aberdeen-shire. The acquisition of CRC-Evans Pipeline International was part of a transformational acquisition that also include Pipeline Induction Head and Stanley Inspection.

In early 2023 the Pipeline Technique group of companies, including Global Project Services, an earlier acquisition from Global Energy Group in 2022, merged into one identity in the newly CRC Evans.

== History ==
CRC Evans Pipeline International was a division of Stanley Oil & Gas, part of Stanley Black & Decker, a Fortune 500 American manufacturer of industrial tools and household hardware headquartered in New Britain, Connecticut. Stanley Black & Decker is the result of the merger of Stanley Works and Black & Decker on March 12, 2010. CRC-Evans supplies energy infrastructure technology and services to the oil and gas industry and owns approximately 129 patents.

Since its founding as Crutcher Rolfs Cummings Inc by AS Crutcher, EL Rolfs and James Dell Cummings in 1933 and its eventual merger with Evans Pipeline Equipment in 1985, CRC-Evans has been a leading oil and gas pipeline construction contractor, manufacturing, selling, renting equipment, and subcontracting pipeline construction services onshore and offshore. CRC-Evans provides pipeline construction equipment, automatic welding systems, managed subsea services, field joint coating, weighting systems and non-destructive testing. Other engineered equipment includes laybarge equipment, conveying systems and concrete weight coating plants.

In 2010, CRC-Evans became a Stanley Black & Decker company.

In 2022, CRC-Evans was acquired by Pipeline Technique, and in 2023 was rebranded as CRC Evans following a merger and rebrand.

== Locations ==
CRC-Evans has provided equipment & services for almost 50,000 miles (nearly 80,000 km) of pipelines in more than 100 countries.

Company offices and facilities are also located in the United States, Canada, the United Kingdom (England and Scotland), Australia, Netherlands, France, the United Arab Emirates, South Africa, Malaysia and Brazil.

== Pipeline Induction Heat (PIH) ==
Pipeline Induction Heat was an oil and gas coatings specialist based in Burnley, Lancashire, UK. From its UK base, PIH supports regional sales and operations in the Americas, Asia Pacific, Europe, West Africa, and the MENA region through collaboration with local CRC-Evans pipeline centers. PIH is a supplier of onshore and offshore coating products, including weld induction heating services, anti-corrosion, infill, abrasion resistant, and flow assurance girthweld coatings. PIH provides custom coating services at its facilities in the UK, Australia, and Malaysia.

PIH has executed projects for Shell (BC10, Perdido), Petrobras (GSNC, P55), BHP Biliton (Shenzi), Statoil (Ormen Lange, Stjerne), Total (Usan), Anadarko (Jubilee), Exxon (Arkutun Dagi) etc. In 2013, PIH was awarded an Offshore Technology Conference Spotlight on New Technology Award for its role in the development and application of the Dow Neptune F offshore flow assurance coating.

In 2022 Pipeline Induction Heat was acquired by Pipeline Technique and in 2023 merged into the CRC Evans business.
