= Mary Siddon =

English thief

Mary Siddon (fl. 1783) was an English thief.

In 1783, Siddon was convicted of stealing a pork ham. She was sentenced to be 'severely and privately whipped, in the presence of females only.' This was considered to be a turning-point in English attitudes to public violence and a marker of the beginning of a more professionalised approach to policing and punishment.
