= Royston Siddons =

Royston Siddons (15 December 1899 – 24 November 1976) was an Australian metal working industrialist.

Siddons founded an industrial empire Siddons Industries Ltd, with subsidiaries in six countries and 1500 employees. SIL included Siddons Drop Forgings and Siddons Rolled Steel, created the Sidchrome brand, and franchisee for Ramset.
