= Try square =

Woodworking tool used for marking and checking 90° angles

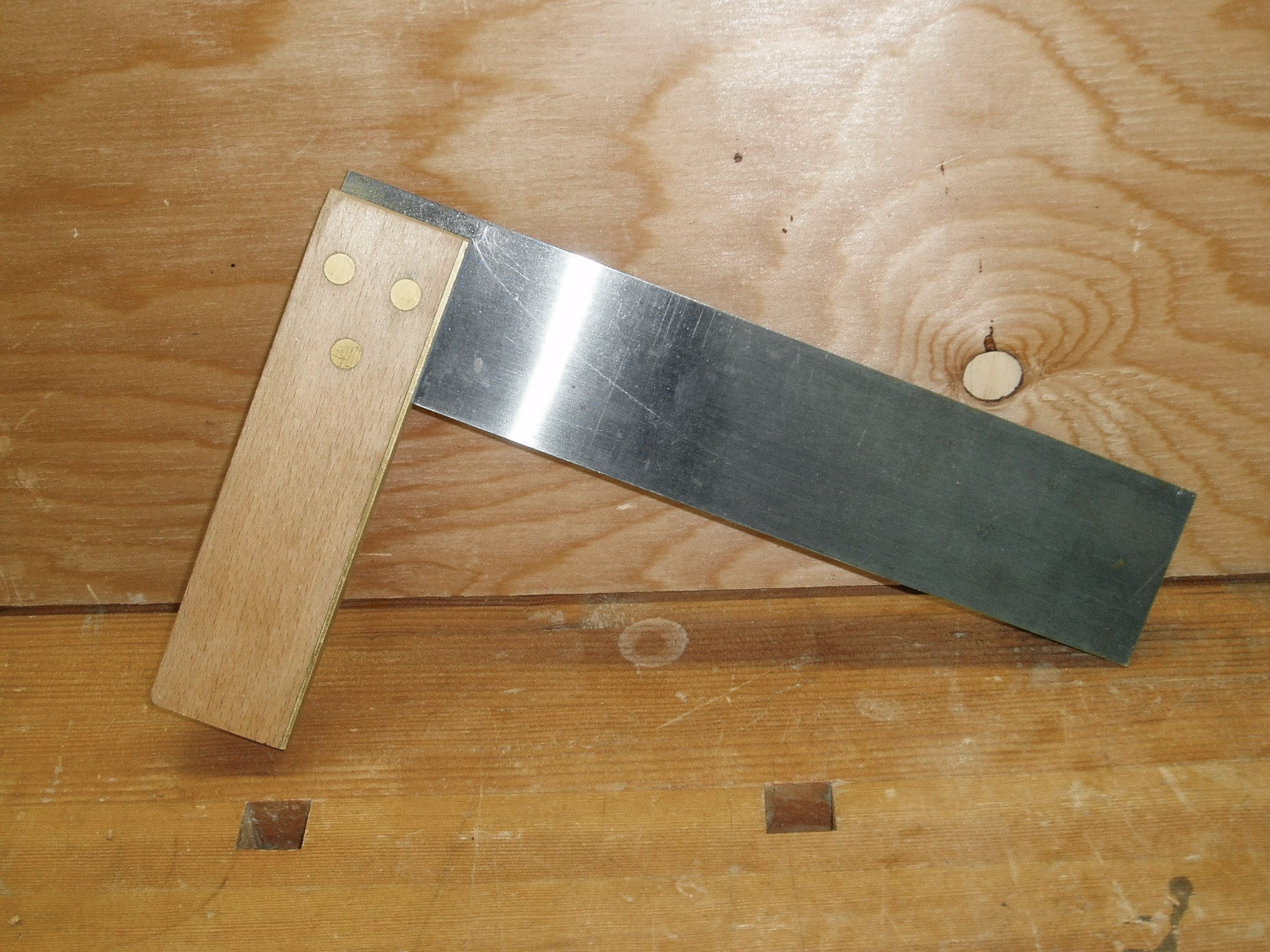
- A try square with a steel blade rivetted into a wooden stock faced with brass.
- Other names: Gallows square; Joiners square
- Classification: Woodworking square; Woodworking hand tool
- Used with: Pencil, pen, marking knife

A try square or try-square is a woodworking tool used for marking and checking 90° angles on pieces of wood. Though woodworkers use many different types of square, the try square is considered one of the essential tools for woodworking.

The square in the name refers to the 90° angle. To try a piece of wood is to check if the edges and faces are straight, flat, and square to one another. A try square is so called because it is used to try how square the workpiece is.

== Description ==
A try square is made of two key parts, the blade (also known as a beam or tongue) and the stock, which are fixed together at 90° to form an 'L' shape.

The blade is usually made of wood or steel and is fixed into the stock, which is usually thicker than the blade and made of wood, metal or plastic. Both the stock and the tongue are usually made with parallel edges. Typically the blade and the stock will be rectangular in profile, though on some wooden squares the ends of the blade and the stock might be cut to a decorative shape. Some steel blades also have ruler markings for making measurements.

Often the top of the stock will not cover the full width of the blade so the stock does not get in the way when making a mark. This gap also allows space should an inaccurate blade need to be planed, filed or sanded.

Try squares are typically 3 to 24 inches (76 to 610 mm) long. 3 in (76 mm) squares are handier for small tasks that don't require a longer square, such as marking small joints. A typical general purpose square is 6 to 8 inches (150 to 200 mm). Larger squares are used for tasks such as cabinetry, and are more likely to be made by the woodworker themselves, but other methods are often preferred for such larger tasks.

A common form of try square has a broad blade made of steel that is riveted into a stable, dense tropical hardwood stock, often ebony or rosewood. The inside of the wooden stock usually has a brass strip fixed to it to reduce wear.

On some squares the top of the stock is angled at 45°, so the square can be used as a mitre square for marking and checking 45° angles.

A similar type of square is the engineer's square, used in metalworking and by some woodworkers. The blade is made with both a steel blade and a steel stock and is usually manufactured to a higher degree of accuracy.

== Use ==
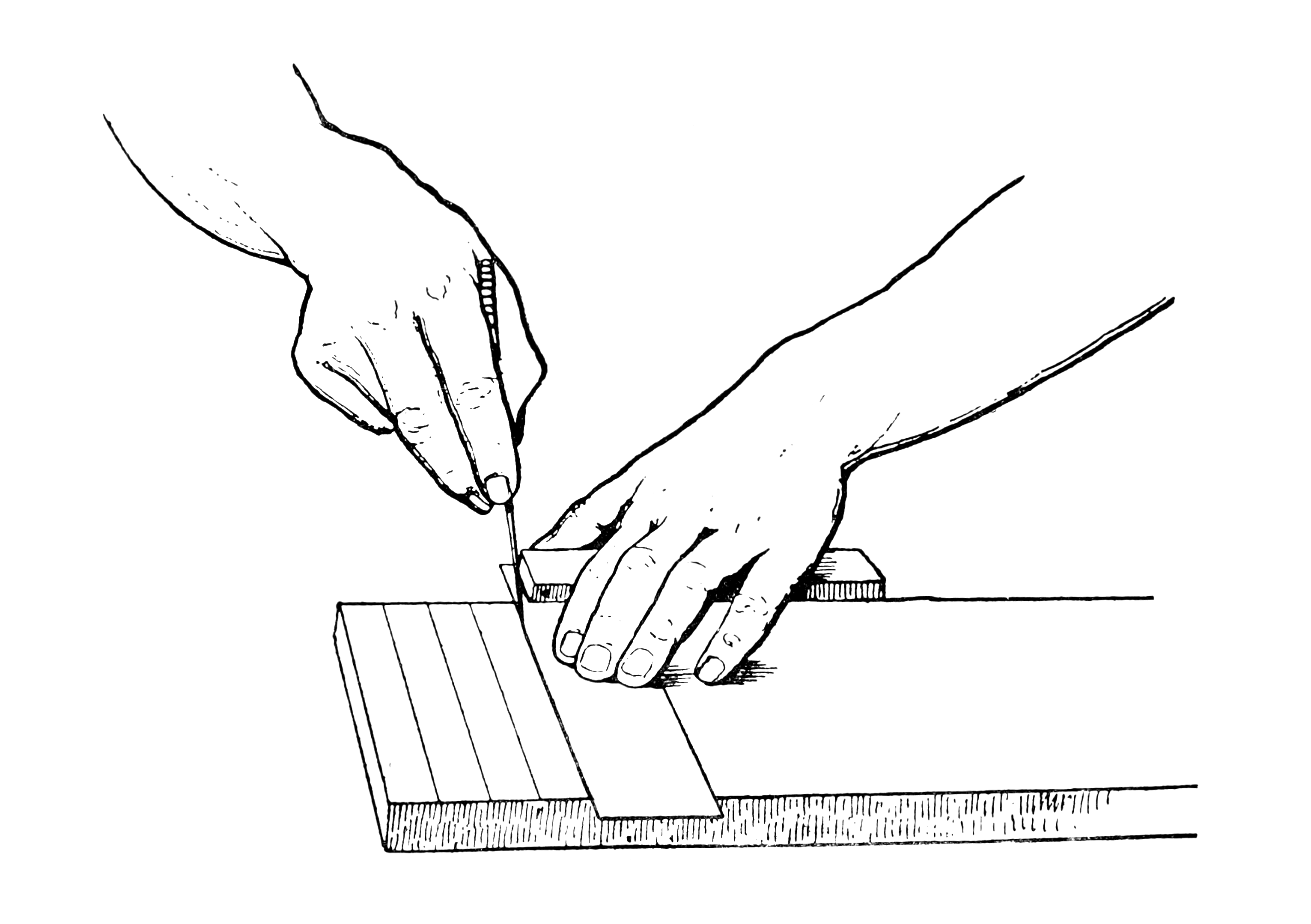
Using a try square to mark lines perpendicular to the edge.

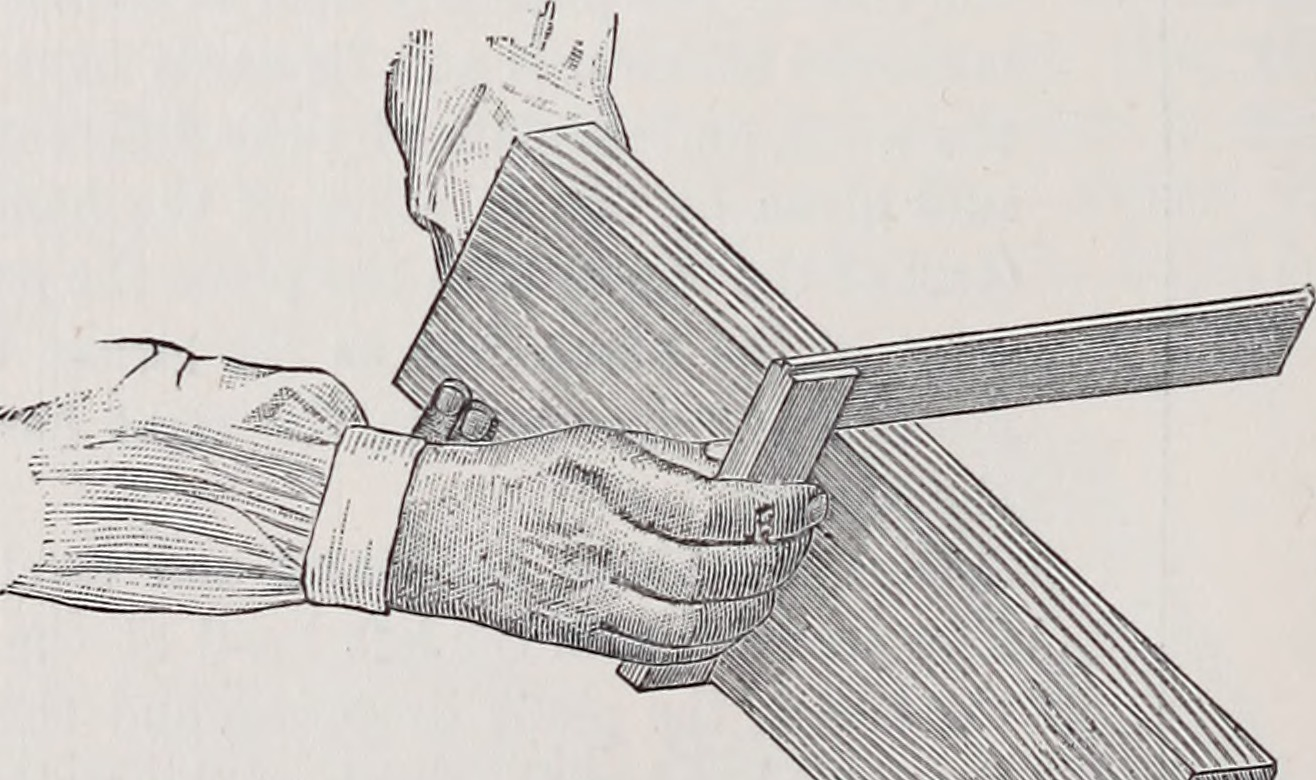
Using a try square to check if the full length of a board is square.

The stock is usually held against the edge of the workpiece and either side of the tongue is then used as a straight edge for making a mark, or as a reference to check the accuracy of an angle.

When checking if an angle is square, the woodworker will test the workpiece in multiple places or will run the square along the length of the workpiece. The woodworker might hold the workpiece up towards a light to help see any gaps between the workpiece and the square. Another method is to try sliding feeler gauges between the square and the workpiece.

For making a mark a woodworker might use a pencil, a pen or, for greater accuracy, a marking knife or blade.

== History and symbolism ==
Wooden try squares have survived from Ancient Egypt and Ancient Rome and can be seen in art from the time. From the 18th century squares began to be manufactured in factories, prior to that they were typically made from wood and made by the tradesmen themselves. Some woodworkers continue to make their own try squares.

The square is incorporated into the most common Freemasonry symbol, the Square and Compasses. Historically squares have also been used by woodworkers, such as joiners and carpenters, as symbols in signs and heraldry to represent their trade. The square as a symbol is also seen in artistic representations of the Christian saints Thomas the Apostle and James the Less.

== Accuracy ==
A square can become less accurate over time through both common use and abuse, such as the edges becoming worn over time or the square being dropped or mistreated. Wooden squares can also vary with changes in temperature and humidity. For this reason more dimensionally stable woods, such as mahogany, are preferred.

There are a number of methods for correcting an inaccurate square by hand. Wooden blades can be corrected using a hand plane and sandpaper, while metal blades can be corrected using a file, emery cloth, or sandpaper.

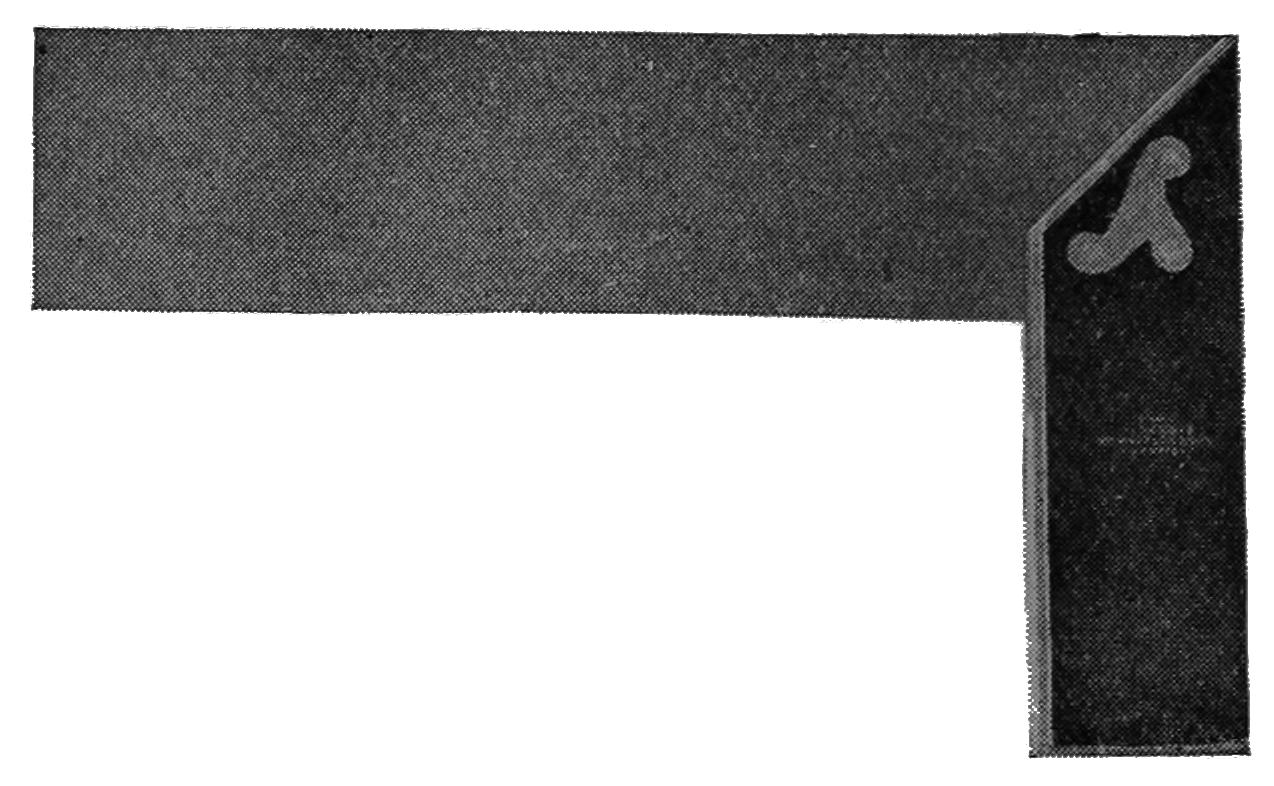
Try square with a 45° mitred stock.

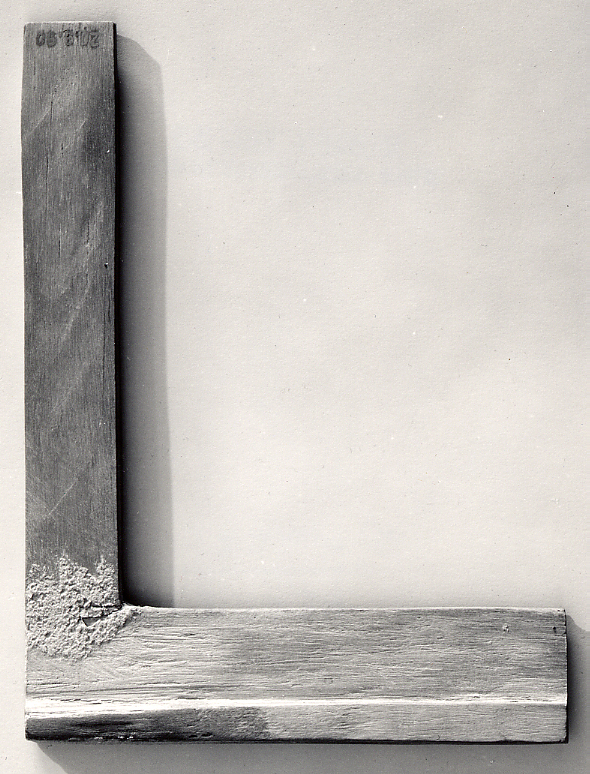
Ancient Egyptian try square from the 20th century BC. Discovered in 1920 in the tomb of Meketre near Thebes.

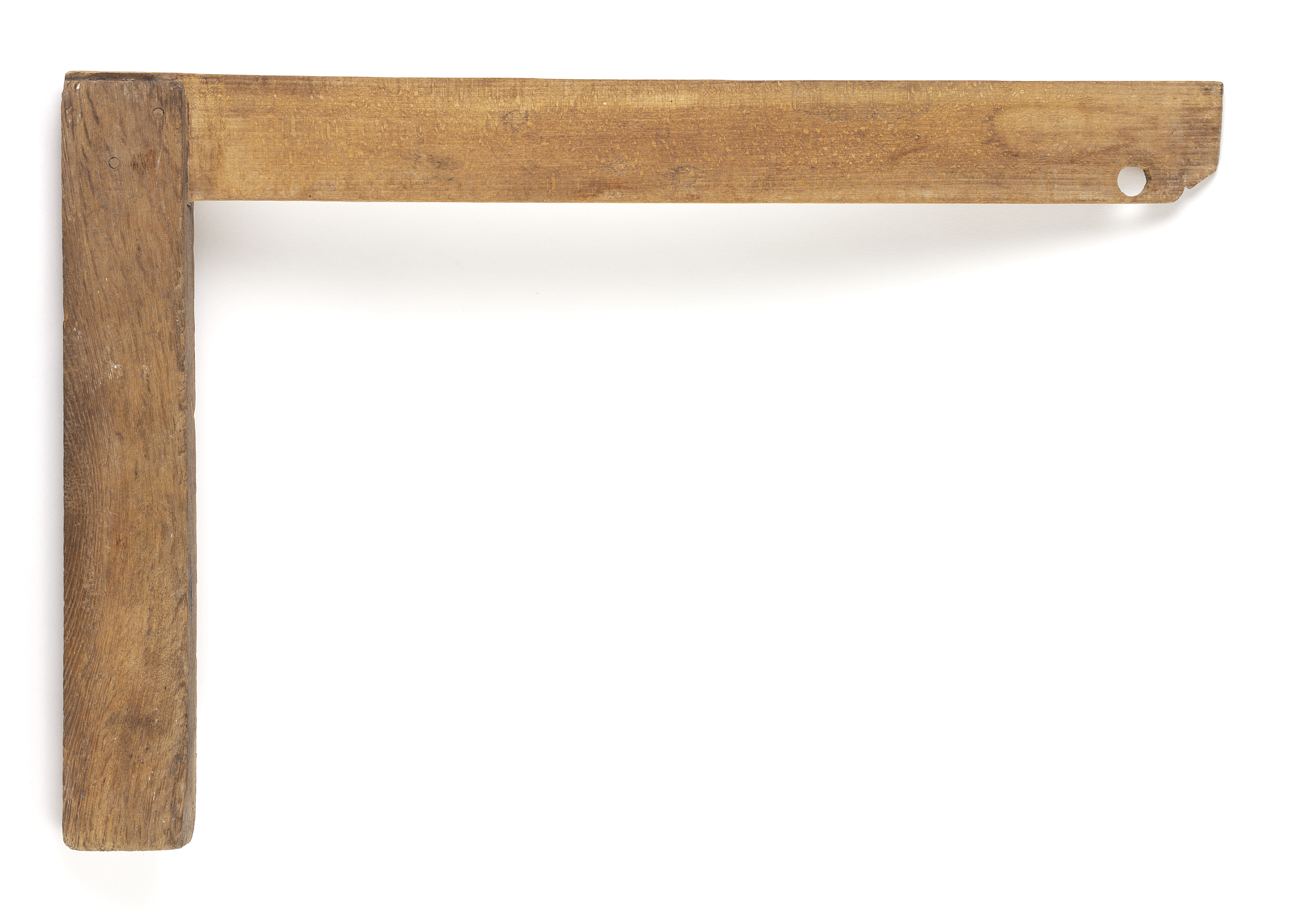
Traditional wooden try square with a slightly curved profile on the blade, from the Skokloster Castle collection.

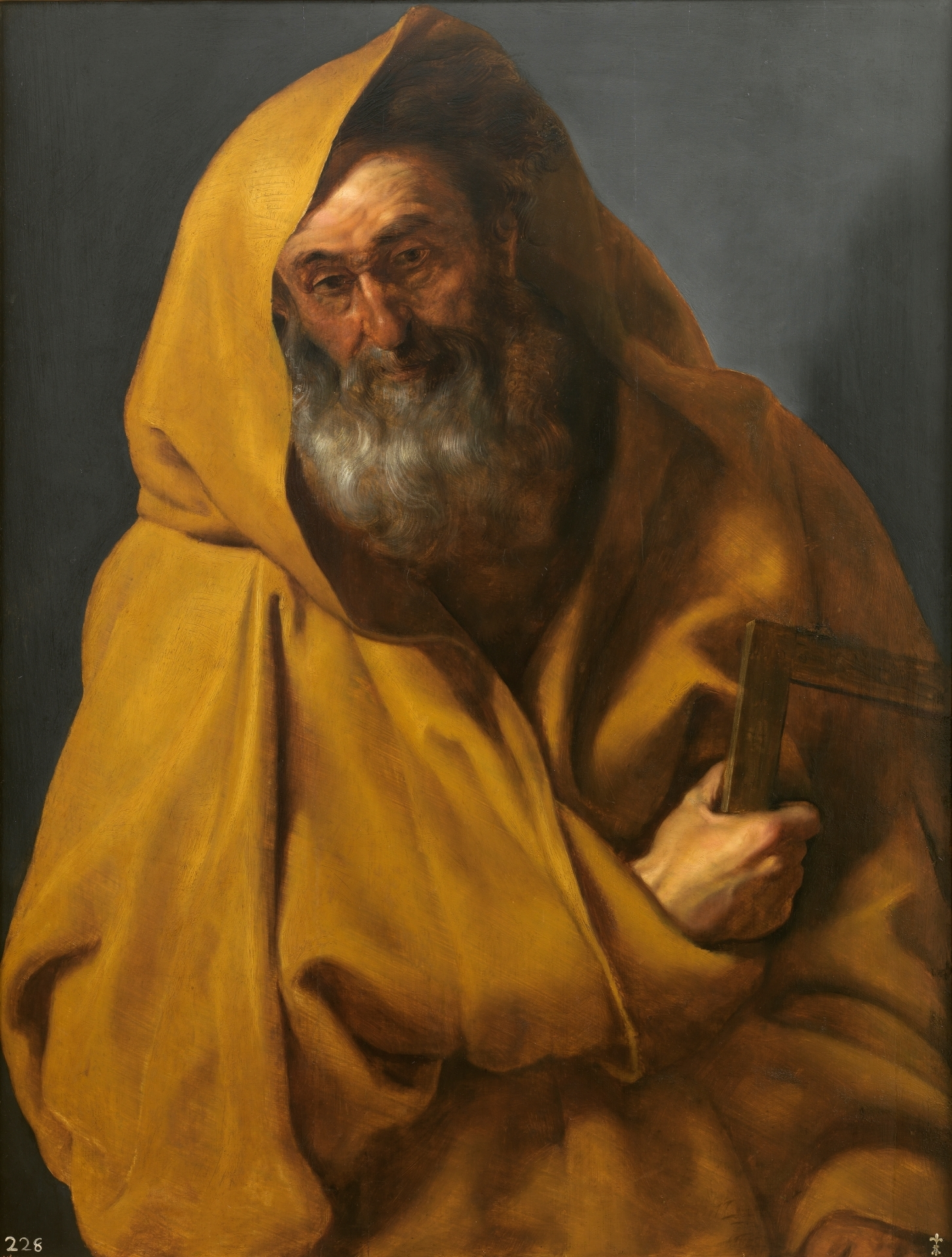
Painting by Rubens of St James the Less clutching a try square, a symbol associated with several Christian saints.

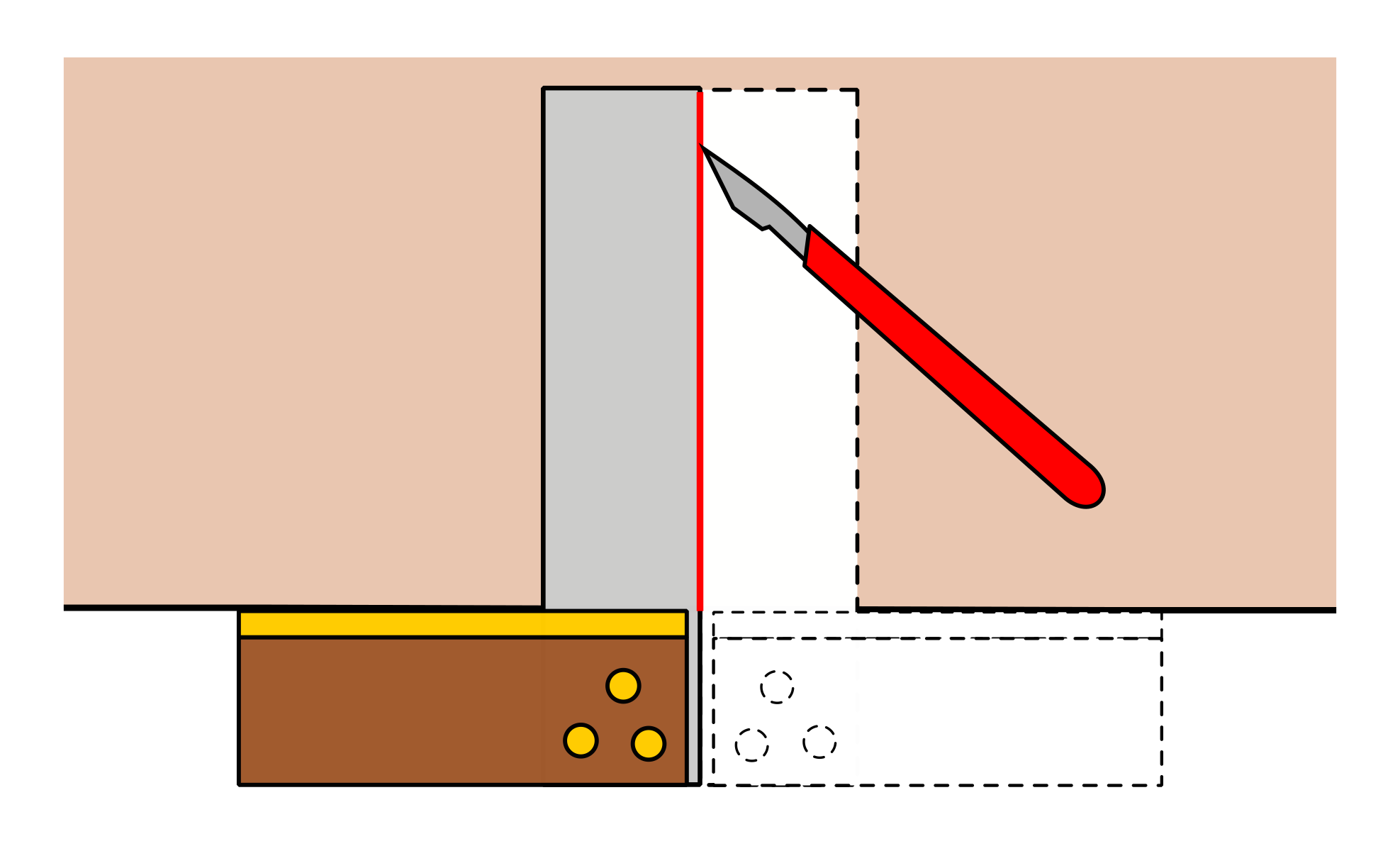
One method for testing a woodworker's try square for accuracy.

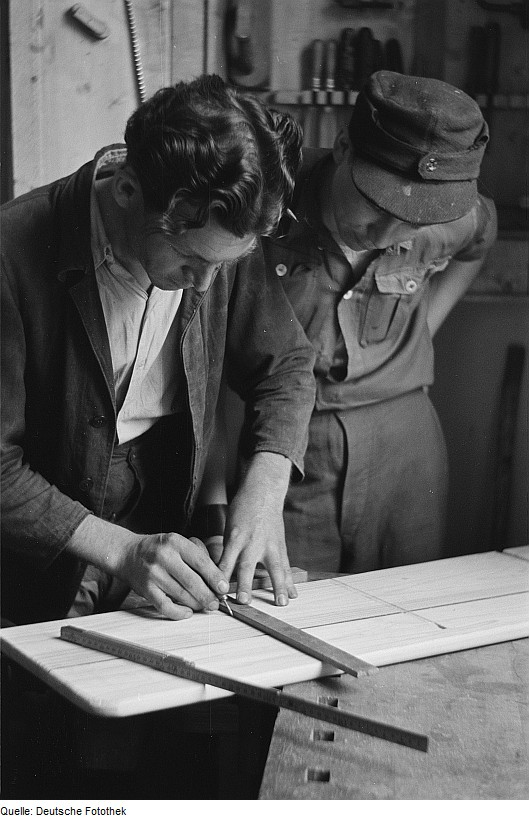
Young prisoner in 1950 using a try square for woodworking.

== See also ==
- Combination square
- Machinist square
- Set square
- Steel square
- Speed square
- Square (tool)
