= Air hammer =

Air hammer may refer to:

- Air hammer (fabrication), a pneumatic hand tool used to carve in stone, and to break or cut metal objects apart
- Air hammer (forging), an air-power hammer that uses pneumatics to drive the hammer
- Air hammer (pile driver), a pile driver that is driven by air
- Air Hammer (Transformers), a Beast Wars character
- Jackhammer, a pneumatic or electro-mechanical tool that combines a hammer directly with a chisel
- Nail gun, a form of hammer used to drive nails into wood or other materials
- Rivet gun a type of tool used to drive rivets

== See also ==
- Pneumatic hammer (disambiguation)
