= Rivet =

Permanent mechanical fastener

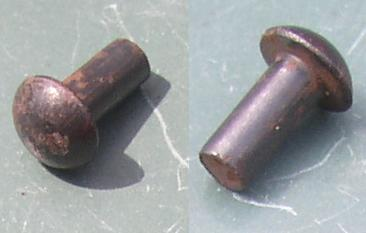
Solid rivets

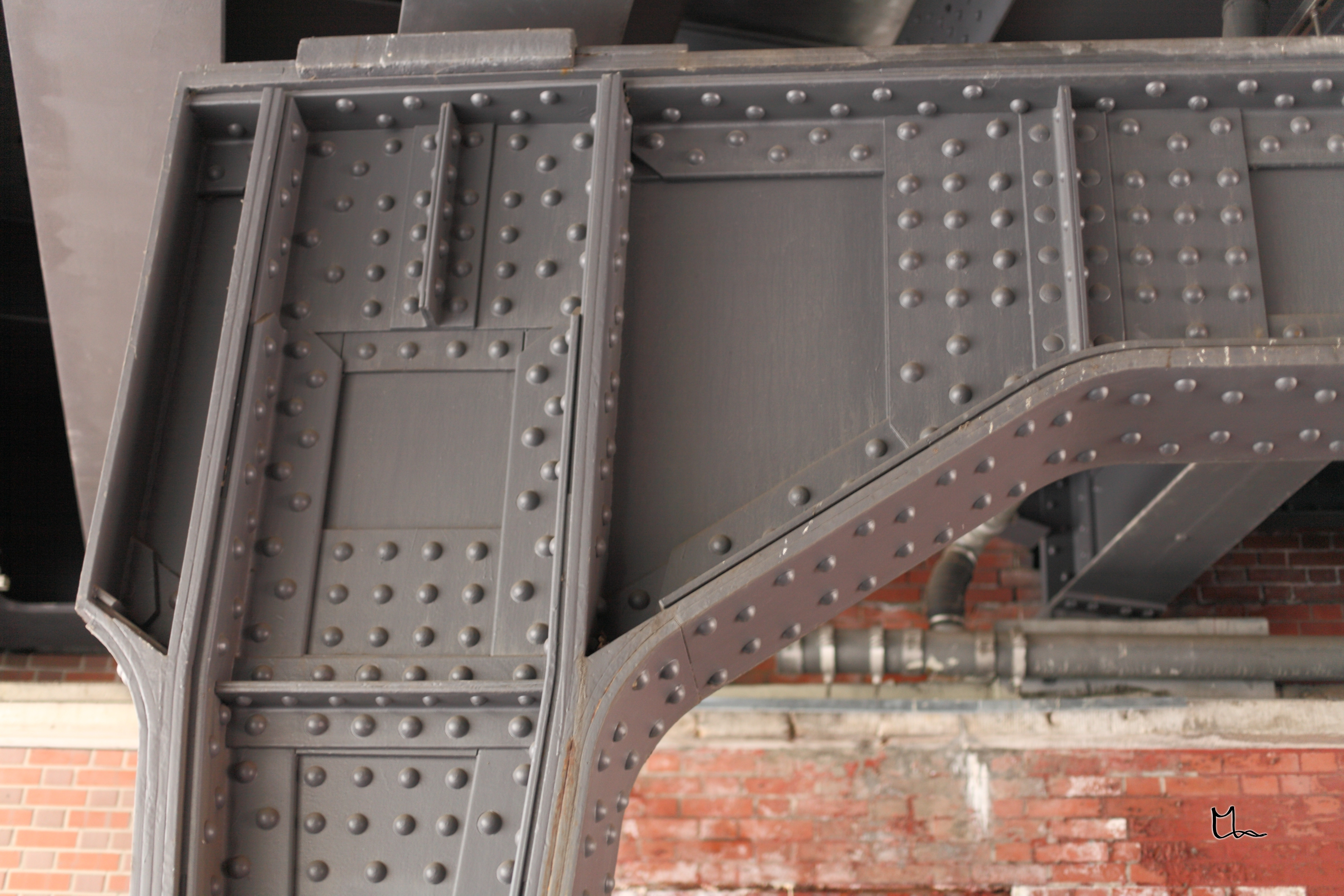
Sophisticated riveted joint on a railway bridge

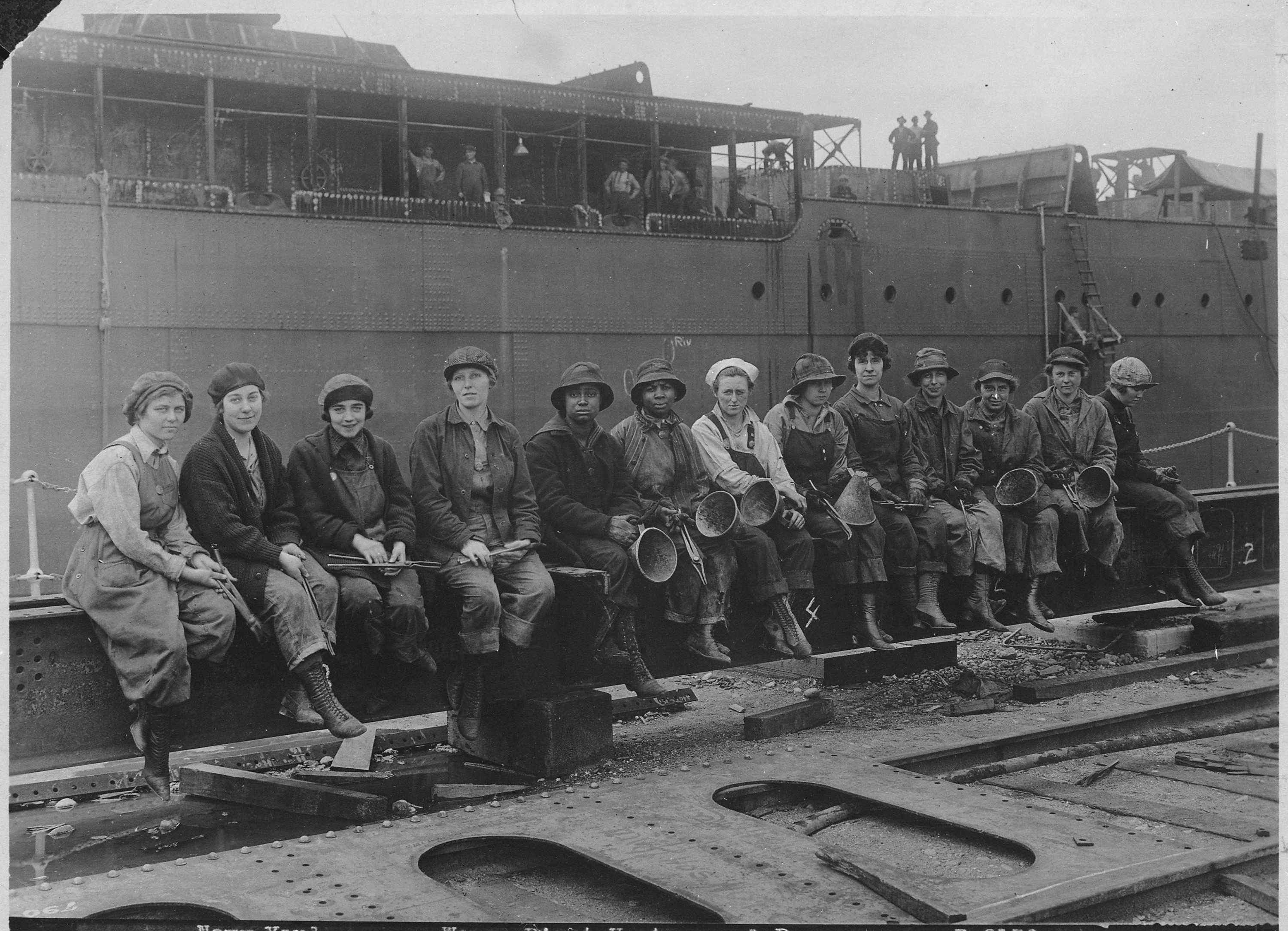
Women rivet heaters, with their tongs and catching buckets, Puget Sound Navy Yard, May 1919

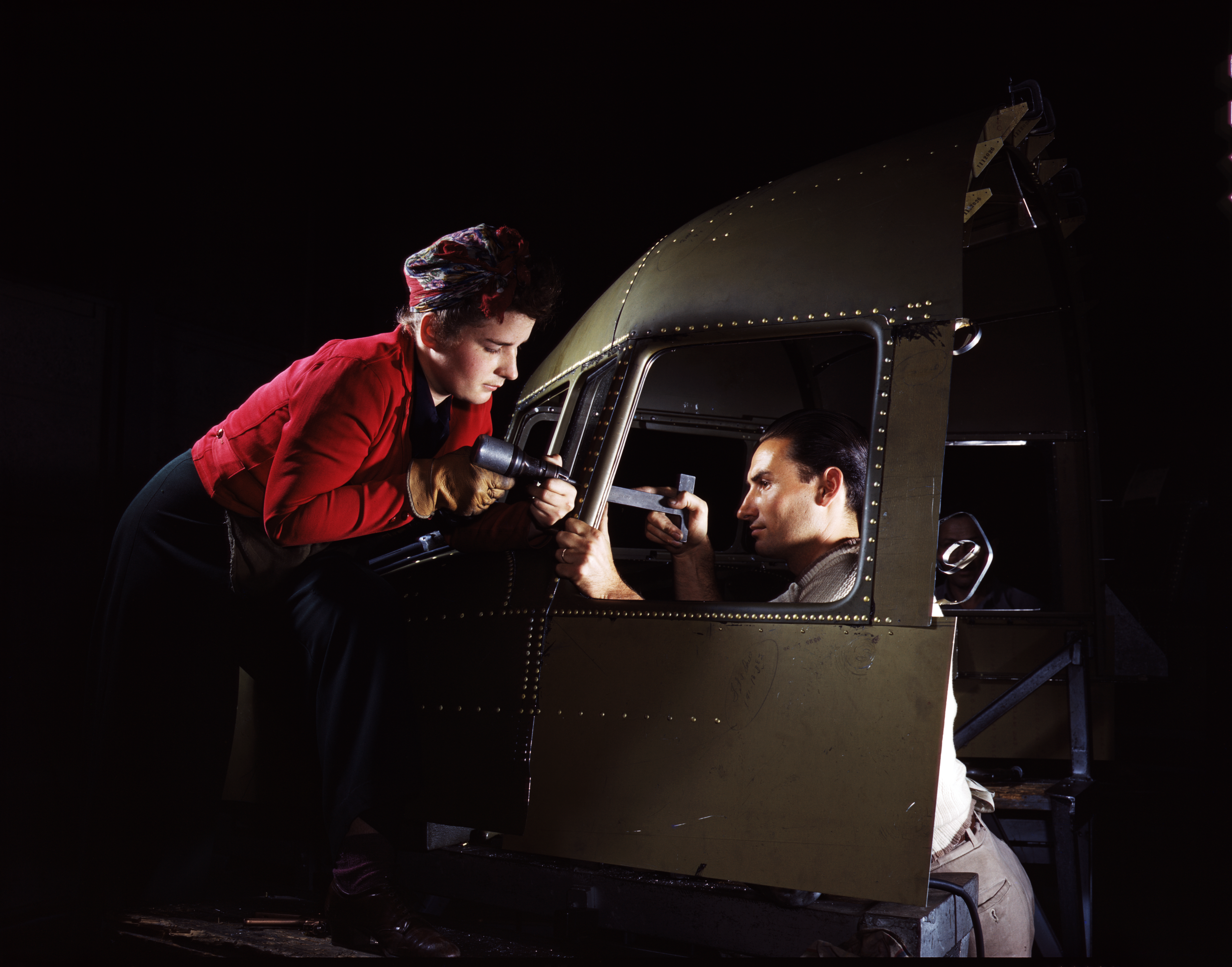
Riveting team working on the cockpit shell of a C-47 transport at the plant of North American Aviation. The woman on the left operates an air hammer, while the man on the right holds a bucking bar.

A rivet is a semi permanent mechanical fastener. Before being installed, a rivet consists of a smooth cylindrical shaft with a head on one end. The end opposite the head is called the tail. A rivet is installed by inserting the tail into a hole and then using tools to flatten the tail into a shape similar to the head. On installation, the deformed tail end is called the shop head or buck-tail.

Because there is effectively a head on each end of an installed rivet, it can support tension loads. However, it is much more capable of supporting shear loads (loads perpendicular to the axis of the shaft).

Fastenings used in traditional wooden boat building, such as copper nails and clinch bolts, work on the same principle as the rivet but were in use long before the term rivet was introduced and, where they are remembered, are usually classified among nails and bolts respectively.

== History ==
Riveters work on the Liberty ship SS John W. Brown (December 2014).

Solid rivets are one of the oldest and most reliable types of fasteners, having been found in archaeological sites dating back to the Bronze Age. Rivet holes have been found in Egyptian spearheads dating back to the Naqada culture of between 4400 and 3000 B.C. Archeologists have also uncovered many Bronze Age swords and daggers with rivet holes where the handles would have been. The rivets themselves were essentially short rods of metal, which metalworkers hammered into a pre-drilled hole on one side and deformed on the other to hold them in place.

High-strength bolts have largely replaced structural steel rivets. Indeed, the latest (14th Edition) steel construction specifications published by American Institute of Steel Construction (AISC) no longer cover their installation. The reason for the change is primarily due to the expense of skilled workers required to install high-strength structural steel rivets.

== Installation ==
There are several methods for installing solid rivets.

- Manually with hammer and handset or bucking bar
- Pneumatic hammers
- Handheld squeezers
- Riveting machines
- Pin hammer, rivet set

Rivets small and soft enough are often bucked. The term bucked comes from a name for one of the two parts of a rivet. The head of the rivet is one part, and is the part that the air-hammer strikes. The other part is referred to as the bucktail, and is the part that the bucking bar is held against. Hence the terms bucking bar, bucked, and buck-man. In this process, the installer places a rivet gun against the factory head and holds a bucking bar against the tail or a hard working surface. The bucking bar is a specially shaped solid block of metal. The rivet gun provides a series of high-impulse forces that upsets and work hardens the tail of the rivet between the work and the inertia of the bucking bar. Rivets that are large or hard may be more easily installed by squeezing instead. In this process, a tool in contact with each end of the rivet clinches to deform the rivet.

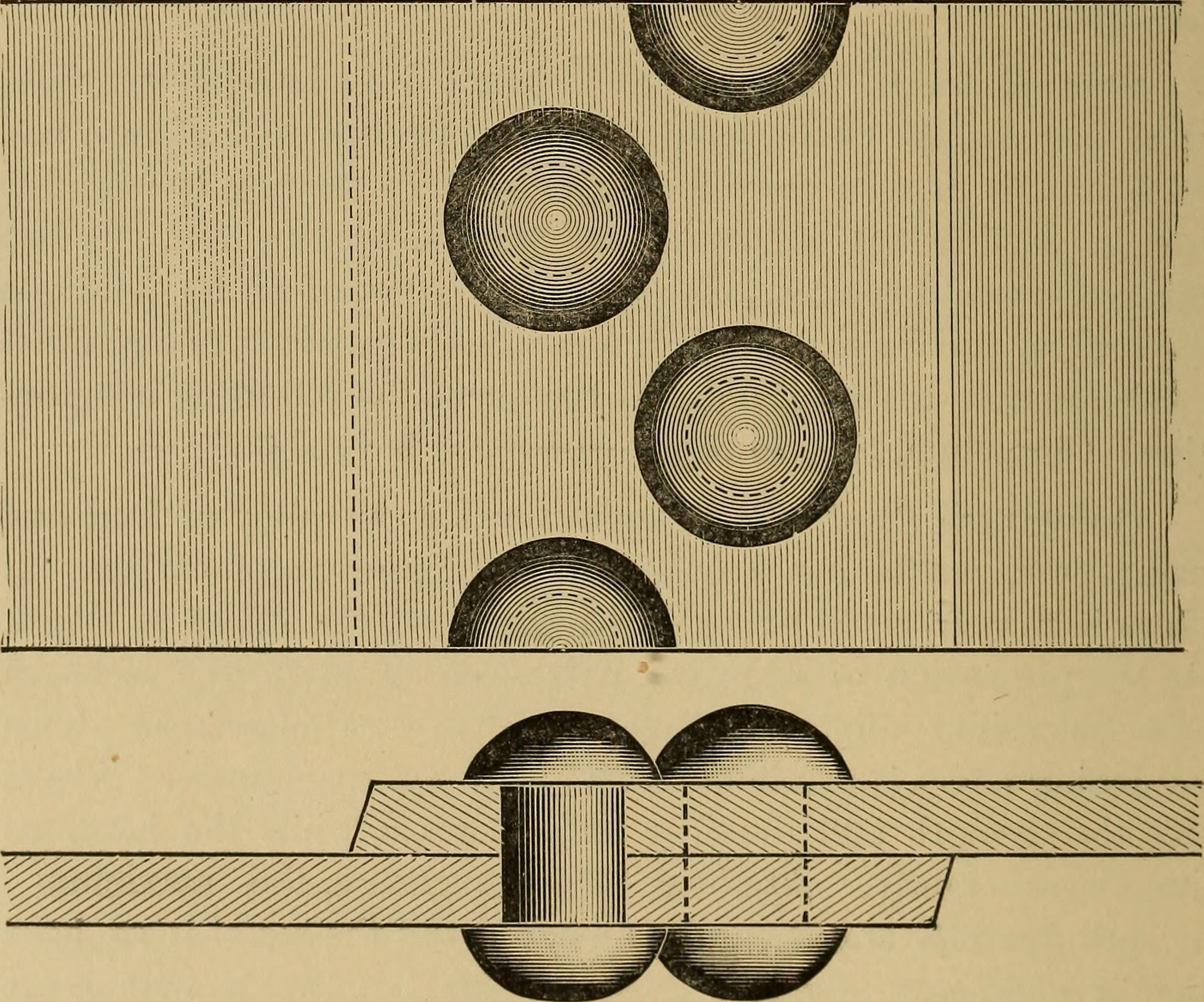
Drawing of round head rivets, 1898

Rivets may also be upset by hand, using a ball-peen hammer. The head is placed in a special hole made to accommodate it, known as a rivet-set. The hammer is applied to the buck-tail of the rivet, rolling an edge so that it is flush against the material.

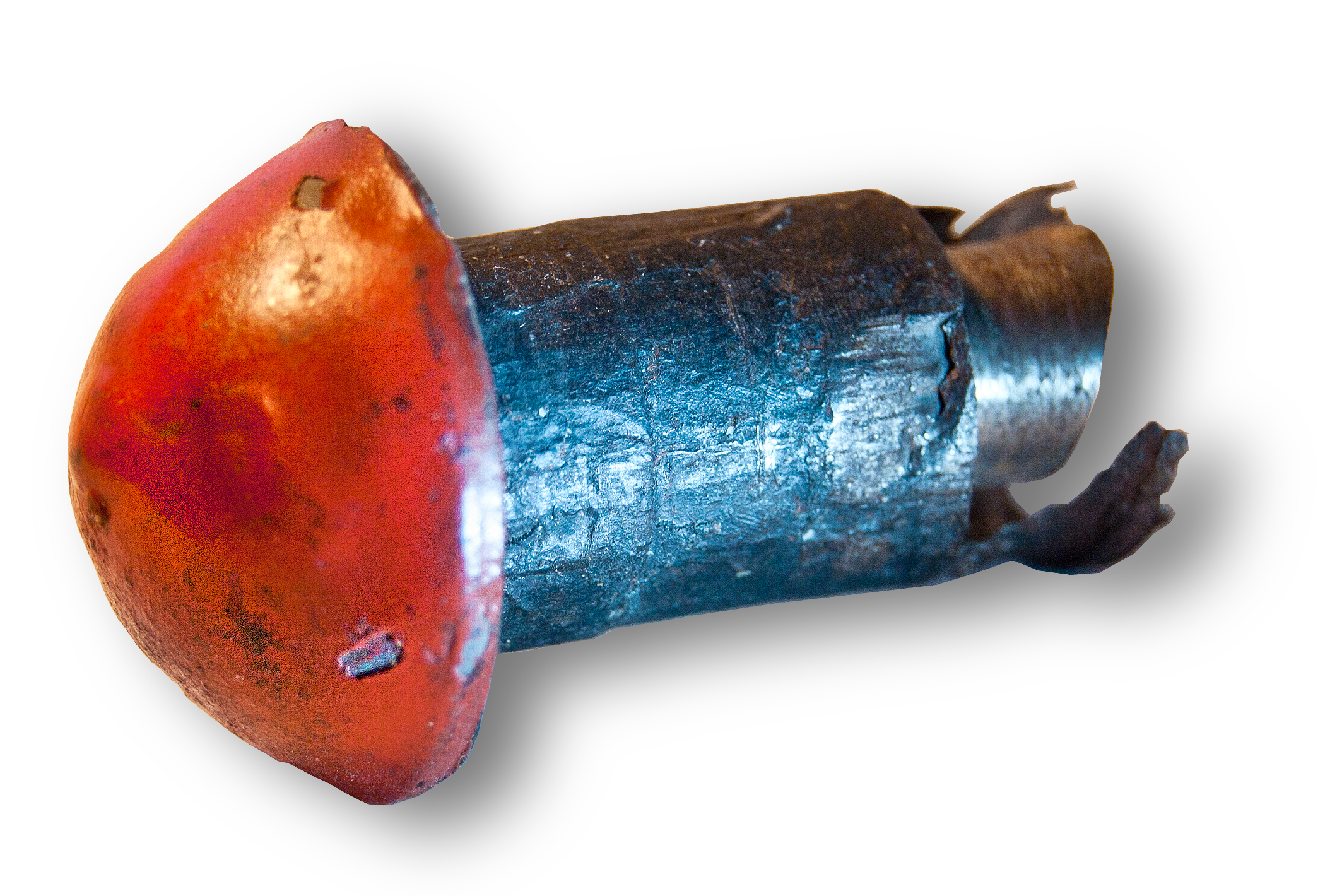
An original structural steel rivet from the Golden Gate Bridge (1937). Removed and replaced c. 2000 during work to reinforce the structure to resist seismic loads.

Until relatively recently, structural steel connections were either welded or riveted. Whereas two relatively unskilled workers can install and tighten high-strength bolts, it normally takes four skilled workers to install rivets (warmer, catcher, holder, basher).

At a central location near the areas being riveted, a furnace was set up. Rivets were placed in the furnace and heated to approximately 900 °C (1,700 °F) or "cherry red." The rivet warmer or cook used tongs to remove individual rivets and throw them to a catcher stationed near the joints to be riveted. The catcher (usually) caught the rivet in a leather or wooden bucket with an ash-lined bottom. The catcher inserted the rivet into the hole to be riveted, then quickly turned to catch the next rivet. The holder up or holder on would hold a heavy bucking bar or dolly or another (larger) pneumatic jack against the round "factory head" of the rivet, while the riveter (sometimes two riveters) applied a hammer or pneumatic rivet hammer with a "rivet set" to the tail of the rivet, making it mushroom against the joint forming the "shop head" into its final domed shape. Alternatively, the buck was hammered more or less flush with the structure in a counter-sunk hole. On cooling, the rivet contracted axially, exerting the clamping force on the joint. Before the use of pneumatic hammers, such as in the construction of RMS Titanic, the person who hammered the rivet was known as the "basher".

== Types ==
=== Solid rivets ===
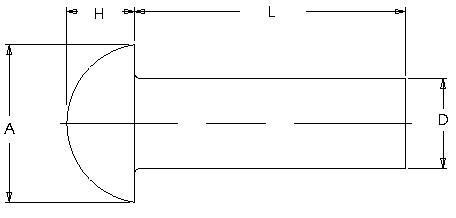
A typical technical drawing of a universal head solid rivet

Solid rivets consist simply of a shaft and head that are deformed with a hammer or rivet gun. A rivet compression or crimping tool can also deform this type of rivet. This tool is mainly used on rivets close to the edge of the fastened material since the tool is limited by the depth of its frame. A rivet compression tool does not require two people and is generally the most foolproof way to install solid rivets.

Solid rivets are used in applications where reliability and safety count. A typical application for solid rivets can be found within the structural parts of aircraft. Hundreds of thousands of solid rivets are used to assemble the frame of a modern aircraft. Such rivets come with rounded (universal) or 100° countersunk heads. Typical materials for aircraft rivets are aluminium alloys (2017, 2024, 2117, 7050, 5056, 55000, V-65), titanium, and nickel-based alloys (e.g., Monel). Some aluminium alloy rivets are too hard to buck and must be softened by solution treating (precipitation hardening) prior to being bucked. "Ice box" aluminium alloy rivets harden with age, and must likewise be annealed and then kept at sub-freezing temperatures (hence the name "ice box") to slow the age-hardening process. Steel rivets can be found in static structures such as bridges, cranes, and building frames.

The setting of these fasteners requires access to both sides of a structure. Solid rivets are driven using a hydraulically, pneumatically, or electromagnetically actuated squeezing tool or even a handheld hammer. Applications where only one side is accessible require "blind" rivets.

Solid rivets are also used by some artisans in the construction of modern reproduction of medieval armour, jewellery and metal couture.

=== Semi-tubular rivets ===
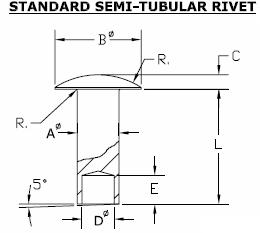
A typical technical drawing of an oval head semi-tubular rivet

Semi-tubular rivets (also known as tubular rivets) are similar to solid rivets, except they have a partial hole (opposite the head) at the tip. The purpose of this hole is to reduce the amount of force needed for application by rolling the tubular portion outward. The force needed to apply a semi-tubular rivet is about 1/4 of the amount needed to apply a solid rivet. Tubular rivets are sometimes preferred for pivot points (a joint where movement is desired) since the swelling of the rivet is only at the tail. The type of equipment used to apply semi-tubular rivets ranges from prototyping tools to fully automated systems. Typical installation tools (from lowest to highest price) are hand set, manual squeezer, pneumatic squeezer, kick press, impact riveter, and finally PLC-controlled robotics. The most common machine is the impact riveter and the most common use of semi-tubular rivets is in lighting, brakes, ladders, binders, HVAC duct-work, mechanical products, and electronics. They are offered from 1/16-inch (1.6 mm) to 3/8-inch (9.5 mm) in diameter (other sizes are considered highly special) and can be up to 8 inches (203 mm) long. A wide variety of materials and platings are available, most common base metals are steel, brass, copper, stainless, aluminium and the most common platings are zinc, nickel, brass, tin. Tubular rivets are normally waxed to facilitate proper assembly. An installed tubular rivet has a head on one side, with a rolled-over and exposed shallow blind hole on the other.

=== Blind rivets ===
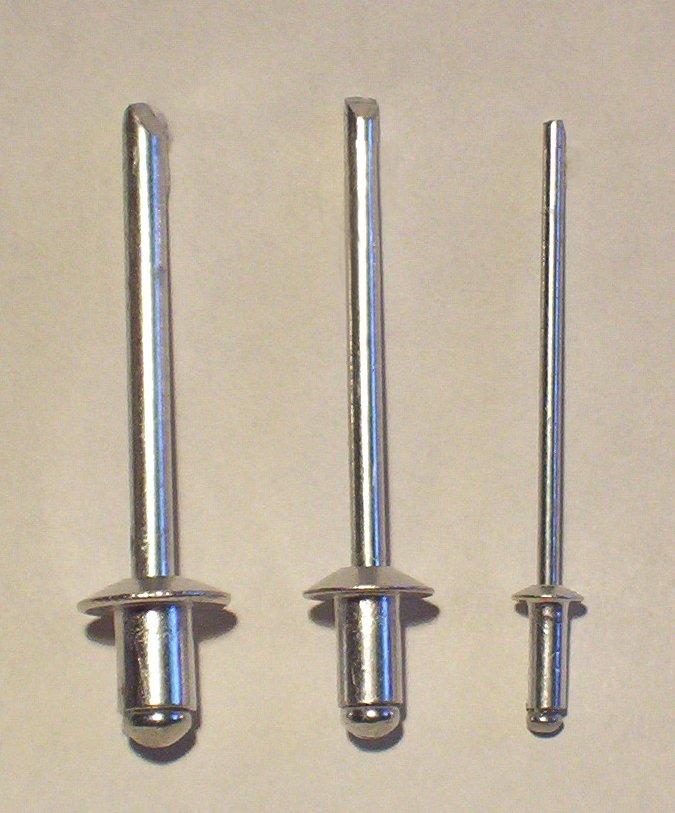
Three aluminium blind rivets: 1/8, 3/32, and 1/16 inch (3.2, 2.4, and 1.6 mm)

Animation of a rivet being tightened (necked area of mandrel not shown)

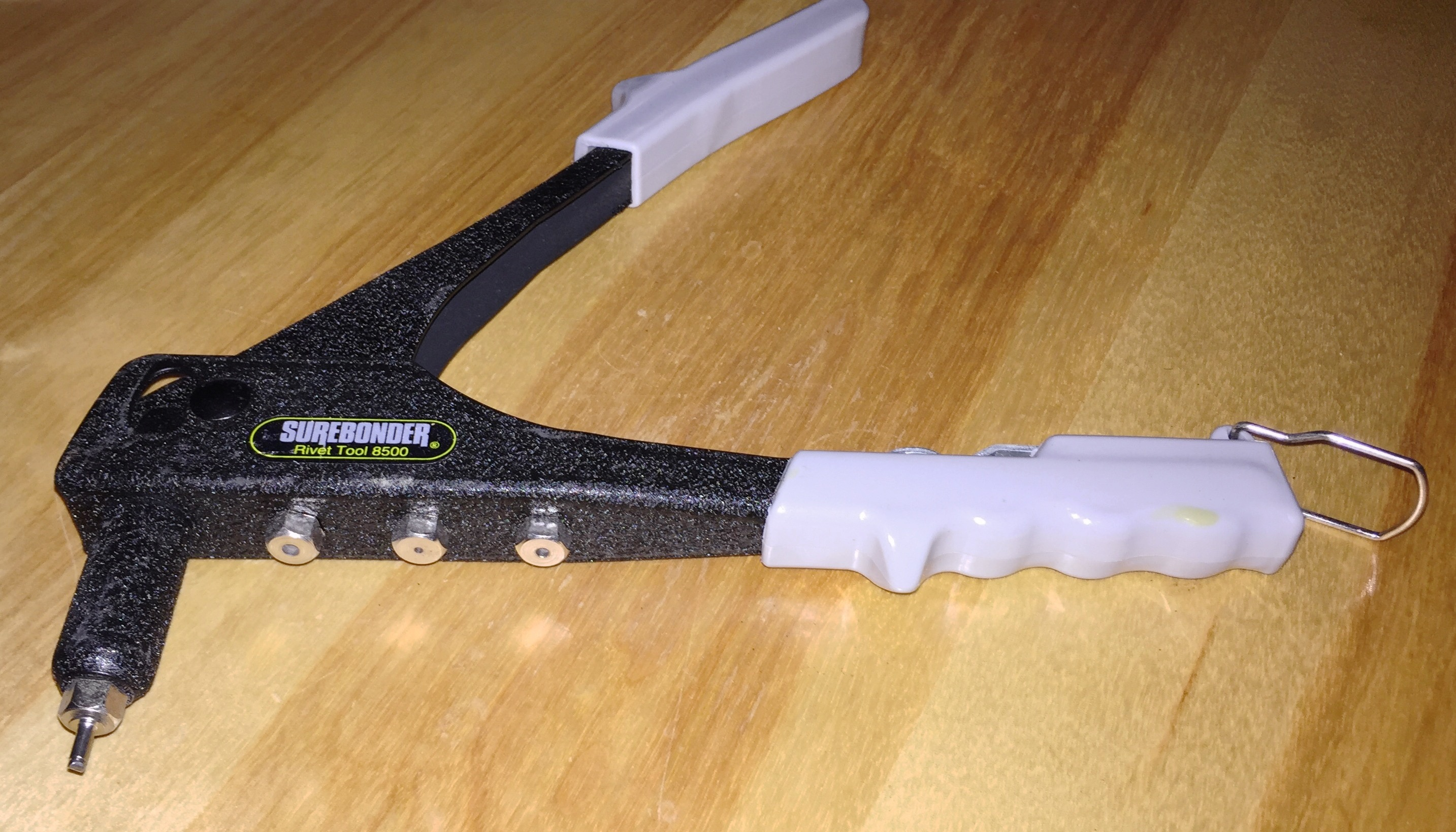
Pop rivet gun with rivet inserted

Blind rivets, commonly referred to as "pop" rivets (POP is the brand name of the original manufacturer, now owned by Stanley Engineered Fastening, a division of Stanley Black & Decker) are tubular and are supplied with a nail-like mandrel through the center which has a "necked" or weakened area near the head. The rivet assembly is inserted into a hole drilled through the parts to be joined and a specially designed tool is used to draw the mandrel through the rivet. The compression force between the head of the mandrel and the tool expands the diameter of the tube throughout its length, locking the sheets being fastened if the hole was the correct size. The head of the mandrel also expands the blind end of the rivet to a diameter greater than that of the drilled hole, compressing the fastened sheets between the head of the rivet and the head of the mandrel. At a predetermined tension, the mandrel breaks at the necked location. With open tubular rivets, the head of the mandrel may or may not remain embedded in the expanded portion of the rivet, and can come loose at a later time. More expensive closed-end tubular rivets are formed around the mandrel so the head of the mandrel is always retained inside the blind end after installation. "Pop" rivets can be fully installed with access to only one side of a part or structure.

Prior to the invention of blind rivets, installation of a rivet typically required access to both sides of the assembly: a rivet hammer on one side and a bucking bar on the other side. In 1916, Royal Navy reservist and engineer Hamilton Neil Wylie filed a patent for an "improved means of closing tubular rivets" (granted May 1917). In 1922 Wylie joined the British aircraft manufacturer Armstrong-Whitworth Ltd to advise on metal construction techniques; here he continued to develop his rivet design with a further 1927 patent that incorporated the pull-through mandrel and allowed the rivet to be used blind. By 1928, the George Tucker Eyelet Company, of Birmingham, England, produced a "cup" rivet based on the design. It required a separate GKN mandrel and the rivet body to be hand-assembled prior to use for the building of the Siskin III aircraft. Together with Armstrong-Whitworth, the Geo. Tucker Co. further modified the rivet design to produce a one-piece unit incorporating a mandrel and rivet. This product was later developed in aluminium and trademarked as the "POP" rivet. The United Shoe Machinery Co. produced the design in the U.S. as inventors such as Carl Cherry and Lou Huck experimented with other techniques for expanding solid rivets.

They are available in flat head, countersunk head, and modified flush head with standard diameters of 1/8, 5/32, and 3/16 inch (3.2, 4.0, and 4.8 mm). Blind rivets are made from soft aluminium alloy, steel (including stainless steel), copper, and Monel.

There are also structural blind rivets, which are designed to take shear and tensile loads.

The rivet body is normally manufactured using one of three methods: wire (the most common method), tube (common in longer lengths, not normally as strong as wire) and sheet (least popular and generally the weakest option).

There is a vast array of specialty blind rivets that are suited for high strength or plastic applications. Typical types include:

- TriFold: a rivet that splits into three equal legs like a molly bolt. Typically used in soft plastics where a wide footprint is needed at the rear surface. Used in automotive interiors and vinyl fences
- Structural rivet(a): an "external" mechanically locked structural blind rivet that is used where a watertight, vibration resistant connection is of importance. Typically used in manufacture or repair of truck bodies. A special nosepiece is required to apply this rivet
- Structural rivet(b): an "internal" mechanically locked structural blind rivet that is used where a watertight, vibration resistant connection is of importance. Typically used in manufacture or repair of truck bodies

Internally and externally locked structural blind rivets can be used in aircraft applications because, unlike other types of blind rivets, the locked mandrels cannot fall out and are watertight. Since the mandrel is locked into place, they have the same or greater shear-load-carrying capacity as solid rivets and may be used to replace solid rivets on all but the most critical stressed aircraft structures.

The typical assembly process requires the operator to install the rivet in the nose of the tool by hand and then actuate the tool. However, in recent years automated riveting systems have become popular in an effort to reduce assembly costs and repetitive disorders. The cost of such tools ranges from US$1,500 for auto-feed pneumatics to US$50,000 for fully robotic systems.

While structural blind rivets using a locked mandrel are common, there are also aircraft applications using "non-structural" blind rivets where the reduced, but still predictable, strength of the rivet without the mandrel is used as the design strength. A method popularized by Chris Heintz of Zenith Aircraft uses a common flat-head (countersunk) rivet which is drawn into a specially machined nosepiece that forms it into a round-head rivet, taking up much of the variation inherent in hole size found in amateur aircraft construction. Aircraft designed with these rivets use rivet strength figures measured with the mandrel removed.

=== Oscar rivets ===
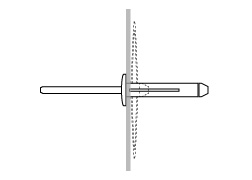
Oscar rivet shown with mandrel (dashed lines depict flare/flange after installation)

Oscar rivets are similar to blind rivets in appearance and installation but have splits (typically three) along the hollow shaft. These splits cause the shaft to fold and flare out (similar to the wings on a toggle bolt's nut) as the mandrel is drawn into the rivet. This flare (or flange) provides a wide bearing surface that reduces the chance of rivet pull-out. This design is ideal for high-vibration applications where the back surface is inaccessible.

A version of the Oscar rivet is the Olympic rivet which uses an aluminium mandrel that is drawn into the rivet head. After installation, the head and mandrel are shaved off flush resulting in an appearance closely resembling a brazier head-driven rivet. They are used in the repair of Airstream trailers to replicate the look of the original rivets.

=== Drive rivet ===
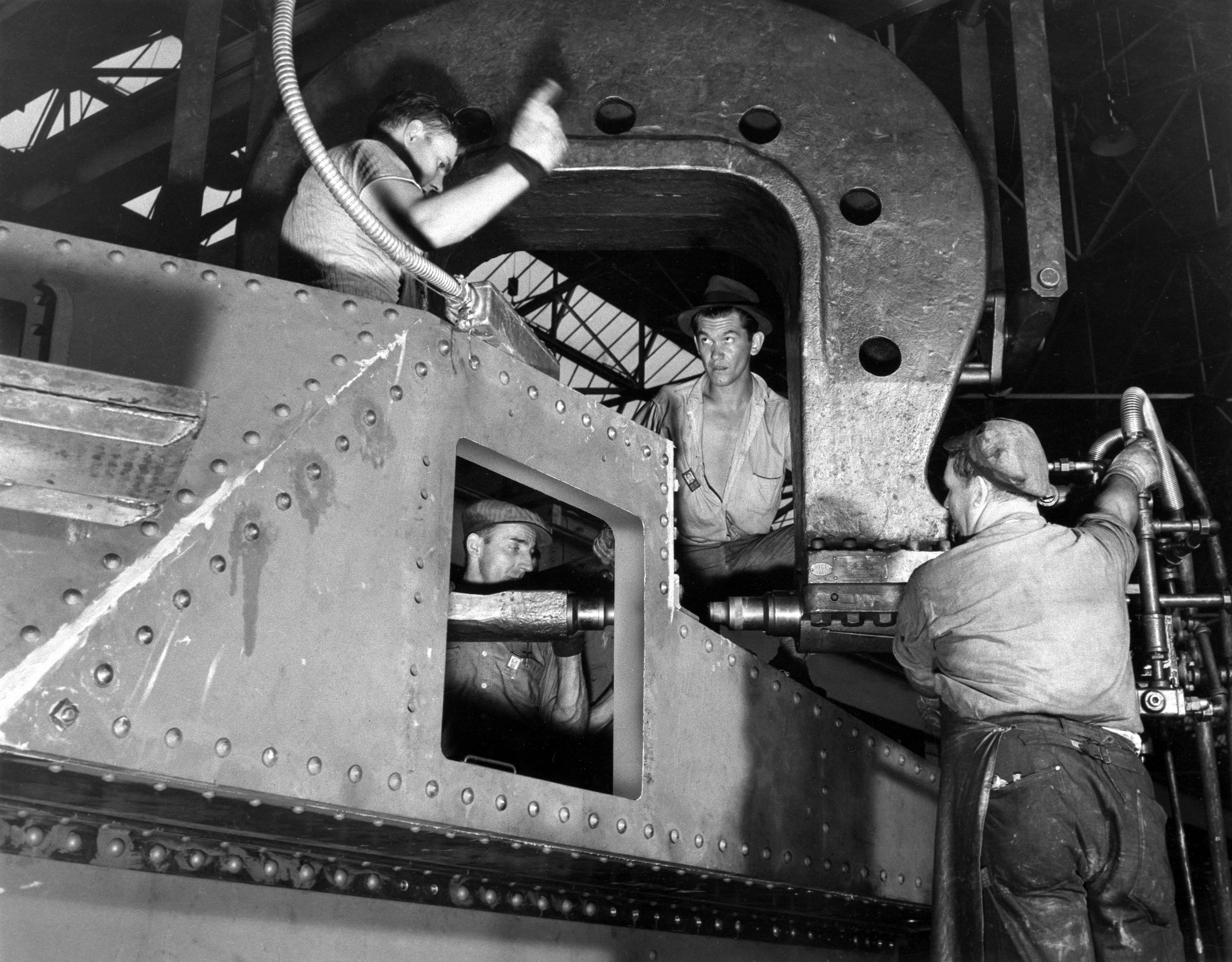
Installing rivets on M3 tank hull

A drive rivet is a form of blind rivet that has a short mandrel protruding from the head that is driven in with a hammer to flare out the end inserted in the hole. This is commonly used to rivet wood panels into place since the hole does not need to be drilled all the way through the panel, producing an aesthetically pleasing appearance. They can also be used with plastic, metal, and other materials and require no special setting tool other than a hammer and possibly a backing block (steel or some other dense material) placed behind the location of the rivet while hammering it into place. Drive rivets have less clamping force than most other rivets. Drive screws, possibly another name for drive rivets, are commonly used to hold nameplates into blind holes. They typically have spiral threads that grip the side of the hole.

=== Friction-lock rivet ===
These resemble an expanding bolt except the shaft snaps below the surface when the tension is sufficient. The blind end may be either countersunk ('flush') or dome-shaped.

One early form of blind rivet that was the first to be widely used for aircraft construction and repair was the Cherry friction-lock rivet. Originally, Cherry friction locks were available in two styles, hollow shank pull-through and self-plugging types. The pull-through type is no longer common; however, the self-plugging Cherry friction-lock rivet is still used for repairing light aircraft.

Cherry friction-lock rivets are available in two head styles, universal and 100-degree countersunk. Furthermore, they are usually supplied in three standard diameters: 1/8, 5/32 and 3/16 inch (3.2, 4.0 and 4.8 mm).

A friction-lock rivet cannot replace a solid shank rivet, size for size. When a friction lock is used to replace a solid shank rivet, it must be at least one size larger in diameter because the friction-lock rivet loses considerable strength if its center stem falls out due to vibrations or damage.

=== Self-piercing rivets ===
Self-pierce riveting (SPR) is a process of joining two or more materials using an engineered rivet. Unlike solid, blind and semi-tubular rivets, self-pierce rivets do not require a drilled or punched hole.

SPRs are cold-forged to a semi-tubular shape and contain a partial hole to the opposite end of the head. The end geometry of the rivet has a chamfered poke that helps the rivet pierce the materials being joined. A hydraulic or electric servo rivet setter drives the rivet into the material, and an upsetting die provides a cavity for the displaced bottom sheet material to flow. The SPR process is described in here SPR process.

The self-pierce rivet fully pierces the top sheet material(s) but only partially pierces the bottom sheet. As the tail end of the rivet does not break through the bottom sheet it provides a water or gas-tight joint. With the influence of the upsetting die, the tail end of the rivet flares and interlocks into the bottom sheet forming a low profile button.

Rivets need to be harder than the materials being joined. they are heat treated to various levels of hardness depending on the material's ductility and hardness. Rivets come in a range of diameters and lengths depending on the materials being joined; head styles are either flush countersunk or pan heads.

Depending on the rivet setter configuration, i.e. hydraulic, servo, stroke, nose-to-die gap, feed system etc., cycle times can be as quick as one second. Rivets are typically fed to the rivet setter nose from tape and come in cassette or spool form for continuous production.

Riveting systems can be manual or automated depending on the application requirements; all systems are very flexible in terms of product design and ease of integration into a manufacturing process.

SPR joins a range of dissimilar materials such as steel, aluminium, plastics, composites and pre-coated or pre-painted materials. Benefits include low energy demands, no heat, fumes, sparks or waste and very repeatable quality.

=== Compression rivets ===
Compression rivets are commonly used for functional or decorative purposes on clothing, accessories, and other items. They have male and female halves that press together, through a hole in the material. Double cap rivets have aesthetic caps on both sides. Single cap rivets have caps on just one side; the other side is low profile with a visible hole. Cutlery rivets are commonly used to attach handles to knife blades and other utensils.

== Surface finish ==
A flush rivet is used primarily on external metal surfaces where good appearance and the elimination of unnecessary aerodynamic drag are important. A flush rivet takes advantage of a countersunk or dimpled hole; they are also commonly referred to as countersunk rivets. Countersunk or flush rivets are used extensively on the exterior of aircraft for aerodynamic reasons such as reduced drag and turbulence. Additional post-installation machining may be performed to perfect the airflow.

Flush riveting was invented in America in the 1930s by Vladimir Pavlecka and his team at Douglas Aircraft. The technology was used by Howard Hughes in the design and production of his H-1 plane, the Hughes H-1 Racer.

== Materials ==
Alloy type	Alphabetical letter	Driven condition	Marking on head
PLAIN
2117	AD	2117T3	Dimple
5056	B	5056H32	Raised cross
2017	D	2017T31	Raised dot
2024	DD	2024T31	Two raised dashes
7050	E (or KE per NAS)	7050T73	Raised ring

The last commonly used high-strength structural steel rivets were designated ASTM A502 Grade 1 rivets.

Such riveted structures may be insufficient to resist seismic loading from earthquakes if the structure was not engineered for such forces, a common problem of older steel bridges. This is because a hot rivet cannot be properly heat treated to add strength and hardness. In the seismic retrofit of such structures, it is common practice to remove critical rivets with an oxygen torch, precision ream the hole, then insert a machined and heat-treated bolt.

== Sizes ==
The main official standards relate more to technical parameters such as ultimate tensile strength and surface finishing than physical length and diameter. They are:

Abbreviation	Issuing authority
AIA / NASM	Aerospace Industries Association (AIA) Imperial Standard, NASM is an acronym for National Aerospace Standards, MIL-STD.
AN / MS	United States Military Standard used by the USA army, navy, or air force is Imperial.
ASME / ANSI	The American Society of Mechanical Engineers (ASME) 18-digit PIN code Imperial system is approved by ANSI and adopted by the U.S. Department of Defense.
BS / BSI	British Standards Institution. provides four-figure BS numbers for Imperial standards and also provides similar BS numbers for official translations into English for the Internal market of the European Union (see below: DIN or SI)
SAE	The Society of Automotive Engineers is a worldwide organization that provides (mostly Imperial) specifications for design and testing for components used in the automotive industry.
JIS	Japanese Industrial Standard (JIS) is a metric system largely based on DIN with some minor modifications to meet the needs of the Japanese market, notably used in Japanese electronic equipment.
DIN	Deutsches Institut für Normung is the German national metric standard used in most European countries because it closely resembles the newer International Standards Organizations (ISO) specifications. DIN fasteners use a DIN style identifier plus the material and the finish or plating (if any).
ISO	International Organization for Standardization (ISO) is a worldwide metric standard. Clarified ISO standards for (metric) fasteners are rapidly gaining international recognition in preference to the similar DIN, on which SI was originally based.

Rivet diameters are commonly measured in 1/32-inch increments and their lengths in 1/16-inch increments, expressed as "dash numbers" at the end of the rivet identification number. A "dash 3 dash 4" (XXXXXX-3-4) designation indicates a 3/32-inch diameter and 4/16-inch (or 1/4-inch) length. Some rivets lengths are also available in half sizes, and have a dash number such as –3.5 (7/32 inch) to indicate they are half-size. The letters and digits in a rivet's identification number that precede its dash numbers indicate the specification under which the rivet was manufactured and the head style. On many rivets, a size in 32nds may be stamped on the rivet head. Other makings on the rivet head, such as small raised or depressed dimples or small raised bars indicate the rivet's alloy. To become a proper fastener, a rivet should be placed in a hole ideally 4–6 thousandths of an inch larger in diameter. This allows the rivet to be easily and fully inserted, then setting allows the rivet to expand, tightly filling the gap and maximizing strength.

Rivet diameters and lengths are measured in millimeters. Conveniently, the rivet diameter relates to the drill required to make a hole to accept the rivet, rather than the actual diameter of the rivet, which is slightly smaller. This facilitates the use of a simple drill-gauge to check both rivet and drill are compatible. For general use, diameters between 2 mm – 20 mm and lengths from 5 mm – 50 mm are common. The design type, material and any finish is usually expressed in plain language (often English).

== Applications ==
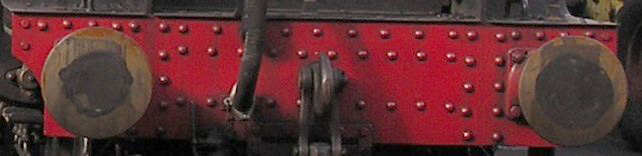
A riveted buffer beam on a steam locomotive

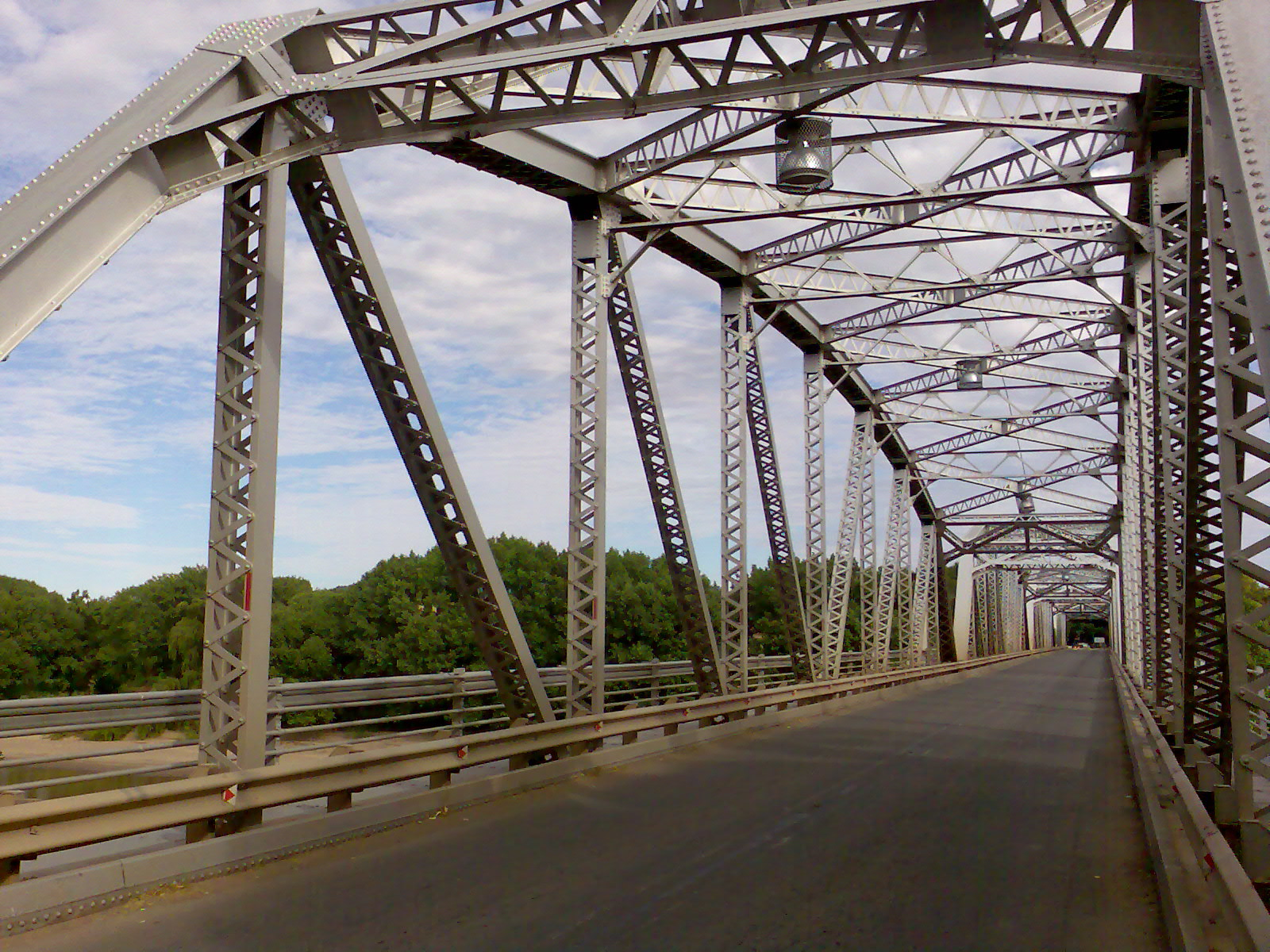
A riveted truss bridge over the Orange River

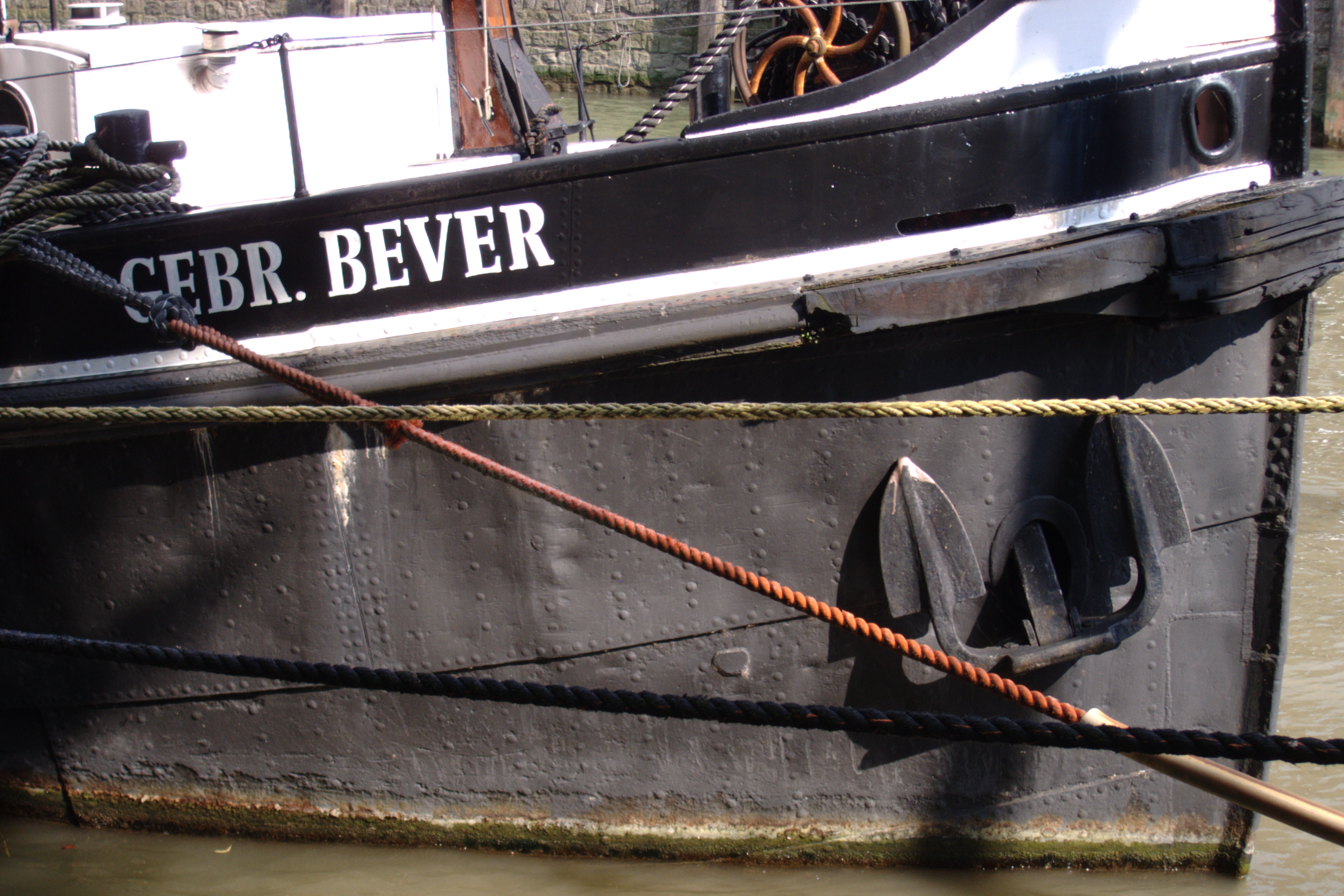
Detail of a 1941 riveted ship hull, with the rivets clearly visible

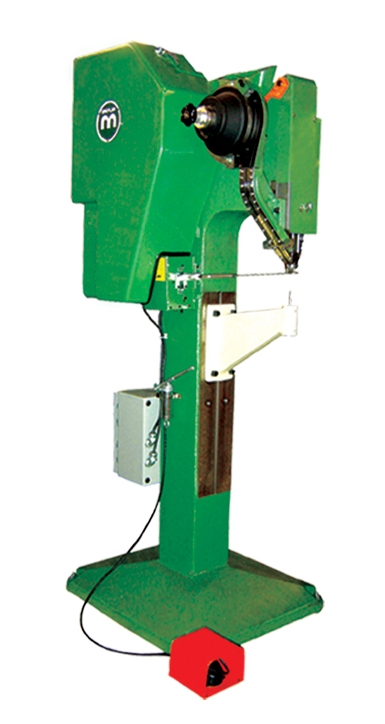
Impact method for solid rivet and semi-tubular rivets

Before welding techniques and bolted joints were developed, metal-framed buildings and structures such as the Eiffel Tower, Shukhov Tower and the Sydney Harbour Bridge were generally held together by riveting, as were automobile chassis. Riveting is still widely used in applications where light weight and high strength are critical, such as in an aircraft. Sheet metal alloys used in aircraft skins are generally not welded, because the aircraft in high-speed flight skins will be stretched, extrusion may occur deformation and change in material properties. Riveting can reduce the vibration transmission between joints, thereby reducing the risk of cracking. The firmness is better and more reliable against such repeated stress changes. In order to reduce air resistance, countersunk rivets are generally used in aircraft skins.

A large number of countries used rivets in the construction of armored tanks during World War II, including the M3 Lee (General Grant) manufactured in the United States. However, many countries soon learned that rivets were a large weakness in tank design since if a tank was hit by a large projectile it would dislocate the rivets and they would fly around the inside of the tank and injure or kill the crew, even if the projectile did not penetrate the armor. Some countries such as Italy, Japan, and Britain used rivets in some or all of their tank designs throughout the war for various reasons, such as lack of welding equipment or inability to weld very thick plates of armor effectively.

Blind rivets are used almost universally in the construction of plywood road cases.

Common but more exotic uses of rivets are to reinforce jeans and to produce the distinctive sound of a sizzle cymbal.

== Joint analysis ==
The stress and shear in a rivet are analyzed like a bolted joint. However, it is not wise to combine rivets with bolts and screws in the same joint. Rivets fill the hole where they are installed to establish a very tight fit (often called an interference fit). It is difficult or impossible to obtain such a tight fit with other fasteners. The result is that rivets in the same joint with loose fasteners carry more of the load—they are effectively stiffer. The rivet can then fail before it can redistribute load to the other loose-fit fasteners like bolts and screws. This often causes catastrophic failure of the joint when the fasteners unzip. In general, a joint composed of similar fasteners is the most efficient because all fasteners reach capacity simultaneously.

== Testing ==
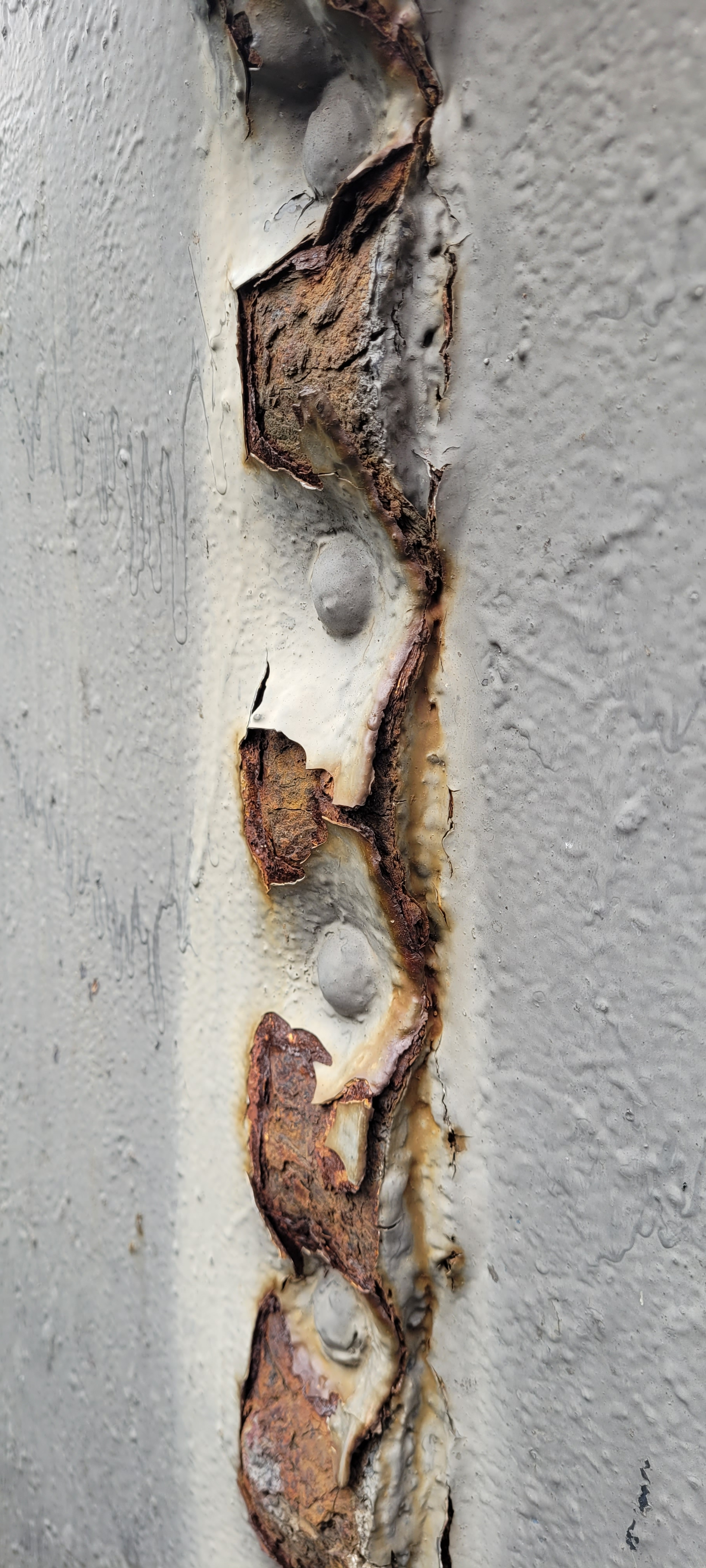
Corrosion led the material to bulge between the rivets on a 1904 cooling tower

A hammer is also used to "ring" an installed rivet, as a non-destructive test for tightness and imperfections. The inspector taps the head (usually the factory head) of the rivet with the hammer while touching the rivet and base plate lightly with the other hand and judges the quality of the audibly returned sound and the feel of the sound traveling through the metal to the operator's fingers. A rivet tightly set in its hole returns a clean and clear ring, while a loose rivet produces a recognizably different sound.

A blind rivet has strength properties that can be measured in terms of shear and tensile strength. Occasionally rivets also undergo performance testing for other critical features, such as pushout force, break load and salt spray resistance. A standardized destructive test according to the Inch Fastener Standards is widely accepted.

The shear test involves installing a rivet into two plates at specified hardness and thickness and measuring the force necessary to shear the plates. The tensile test is basically the same, except that it measures the pullout strength. Per the IFI-135 standard, all blind rivets produced must meet this standard. These tests determine the strength of the rivet, and not the strength of the assembly. To determine the strength of the assembly a user must consult an engineering guide or the Machinery's Handbook.

== See also ==
- Boiler – Closed vessel in which fluid is heated
- Cleco – Temporary mechanical fastener
- Clinker (boat building) – Method of constructing boats and ships
- Rivet nut – Kind of threaded insert
- Rosie the Riveter – Cultural icon of the US during World War II

== Bibliography ==
- Smith, Carroll (1990). Carroll Smith's Nuts, Bolts, Fasteners, and Plumbing Handbook. MotorBooks/MBI Publishing Company. p. 112. ISBN 978-0-87938-406-7.
