= Air hammer (fabrication) =

Pneumatic hand tool to break through materials

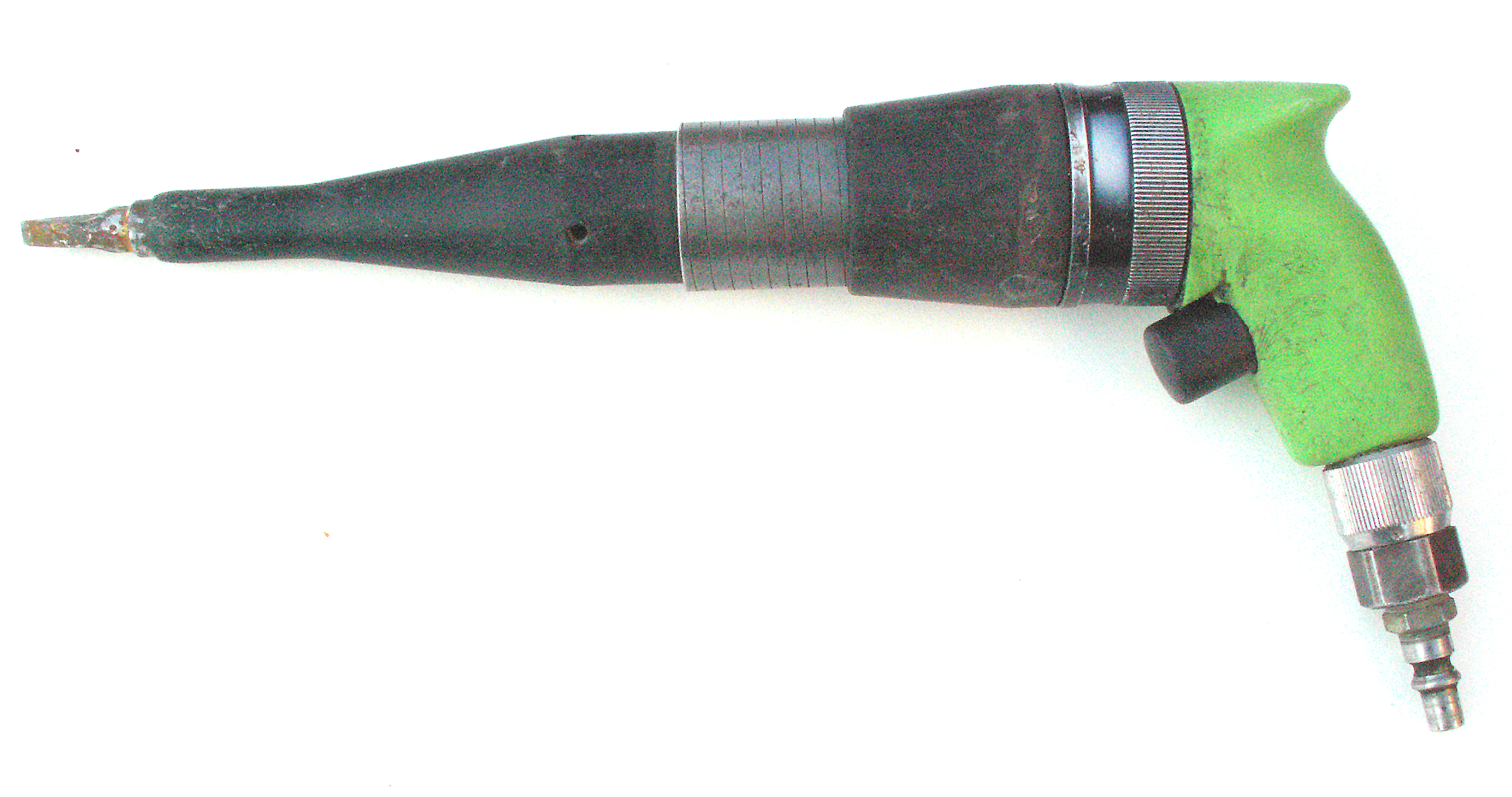
A German pistol-type air hammer

An air hammer, also known as an air chisel, is a pneumatic hand tool used to carve in stone, and to break or cut metal objects apart. It is designed to accept different tools depending on the required function.

== Tools ==
The following are various tools that can be used in an air hammer:

Universal joint and tie-rod tool
Used to separate universal joints and tie-rod ends.
Ball joint separator
Used to separate ball joints.
Shock absorber chisel
Used to break loose shock absorber nuts.
Exhaust pipe cutter
Used to cut through exhaust pipe for disassembly.
Tapered punch
A general tool that can be used to free frozen nuts, insert pins, and align holes.
Rubber bushing splitter
Used to remove rubber bushings.

== Free-standing style ==
Free-standing air hammers are an adaptation of the hand-held version. An air hammer can stretch or shrink (shape) a variety of metals, from thin aircraft aluminums, all the way down to 10-gauge steel. They are also used for smoothing metal that has already been roughed, shaped or formed.

== History ==
In the 1920s, two pneumatic devices were invented that would permanently change the way metal and stone were hammered. The pneumatic rivet gun was originally developed to set hot rivets on girder bridges and high steel buildings. This tool was later scaled down for sheet metal, as the 1930s saw the advent of monocoque aluminum aircraft. The other new device, hitting at twice or three times the speed of the rivet gun, was the stone carver's hammer – a great blessing for smooth and rapid dressing of granite and marble.

In 1930 F.J. Hauschild adapted the original stone carver's hammer into a portable hand-held steel tube frame for the purpose of straightening auto bodies. For the next 25 years his "Ram's Head Body and Fender Machine" improved and increased production for auto body work men all over the U.S. Copying Hauschild's patented design, a pneumatic tool company in Chicago marketed a number of "destined-to-be-classic" pneumatic planishing hammers, both hand-held for auto body work, and also free-standing ones, with a variety of throat depths for industry and manufacturing.

By World War II, rivet guns were used widely in U.S. aircraft factories both for riveting aluminum sheets, and for flow forming, the process of working aluminum sheet into and over wooden forms by the application of the pneumatic rivet gun.

Post-war industry brought many new applications for the "air hammer" technology. Among these were:

- sand rammers and tampers for sand casting metal
- plating rack scalers
- weld chippers
- destruction guns for cleaning up concrete
- needle scalers
- pavement breakers
- metal chisels.

Each of these tools has a different purpose despite nearly identical appearance in many cases.

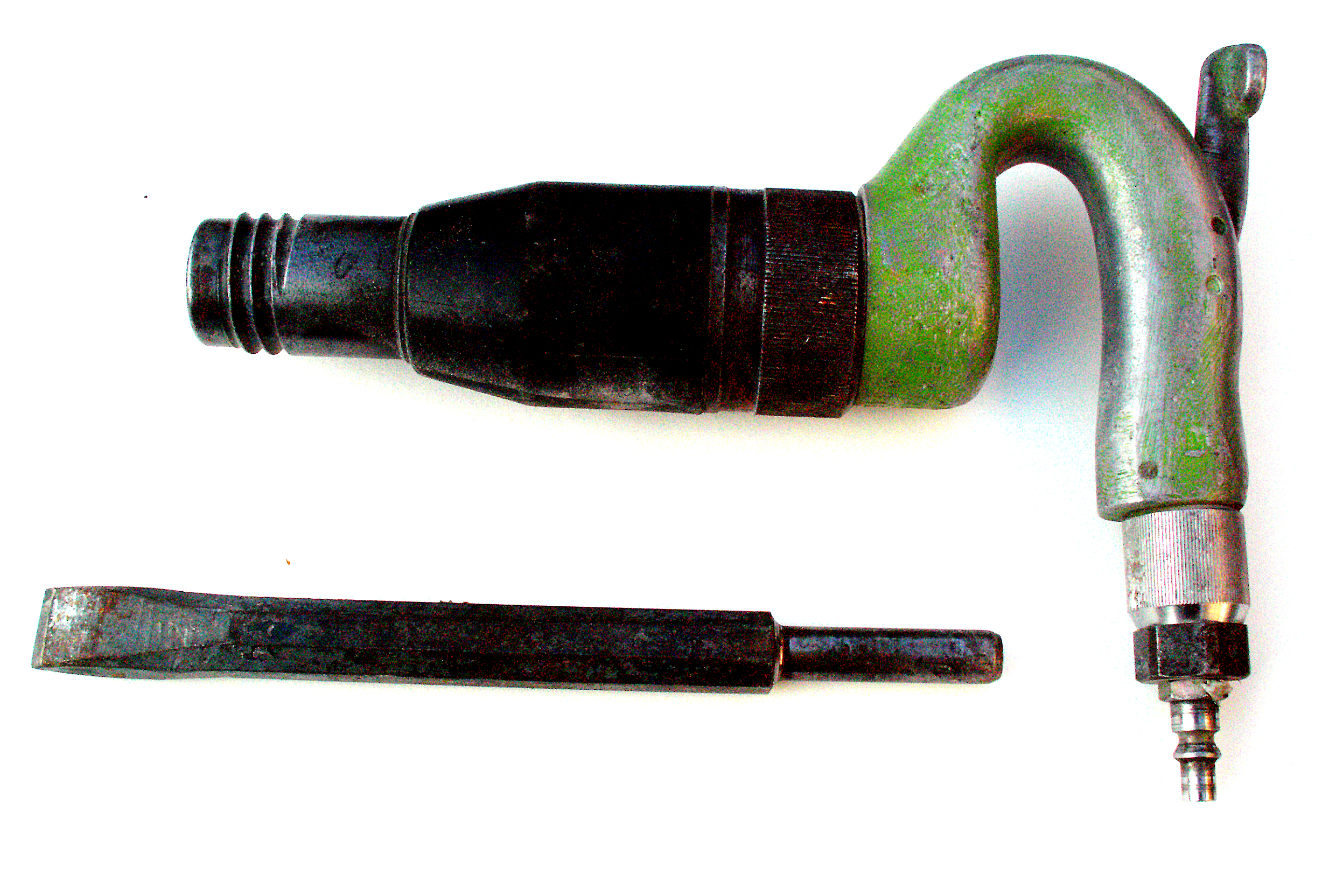

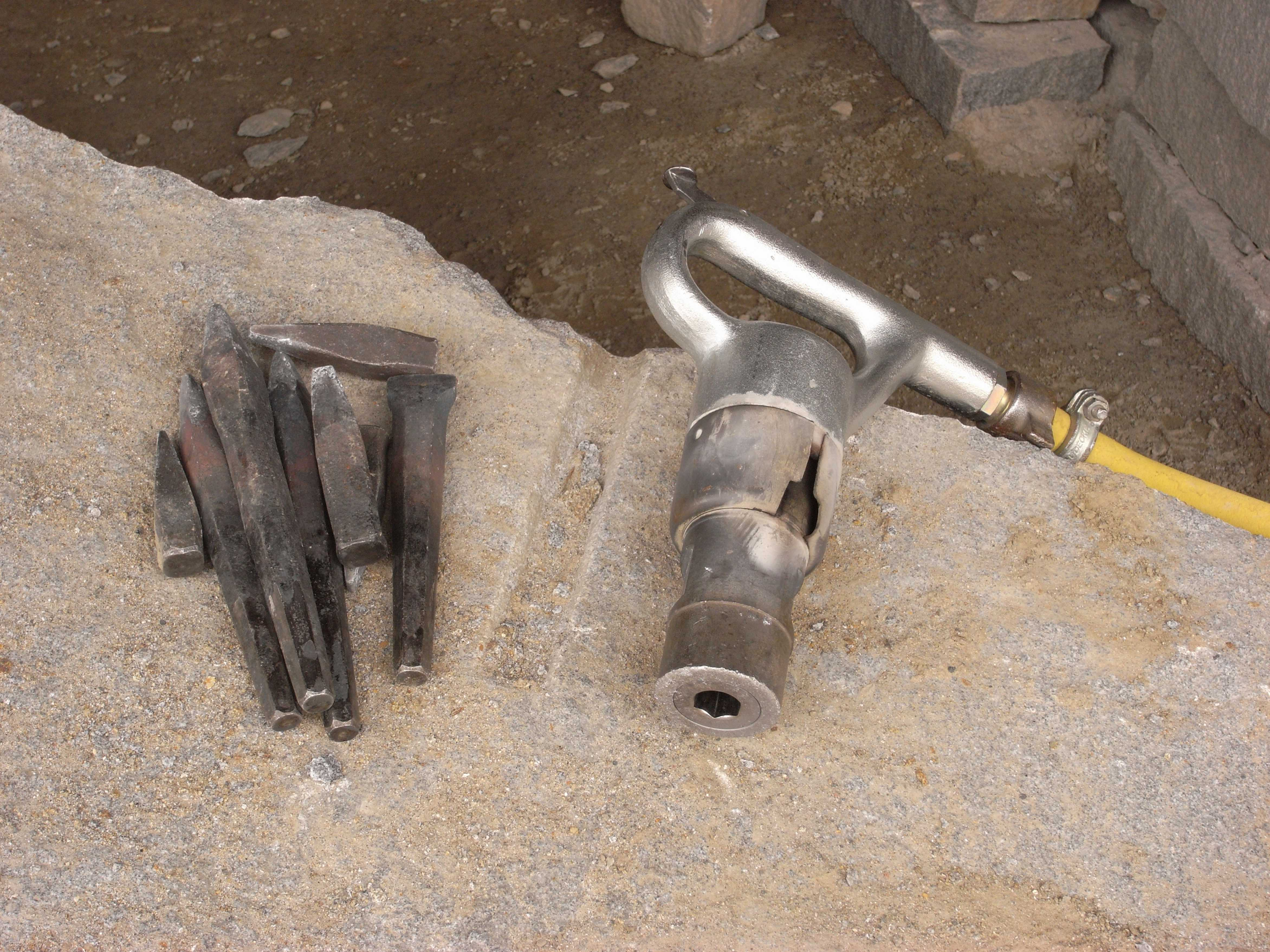

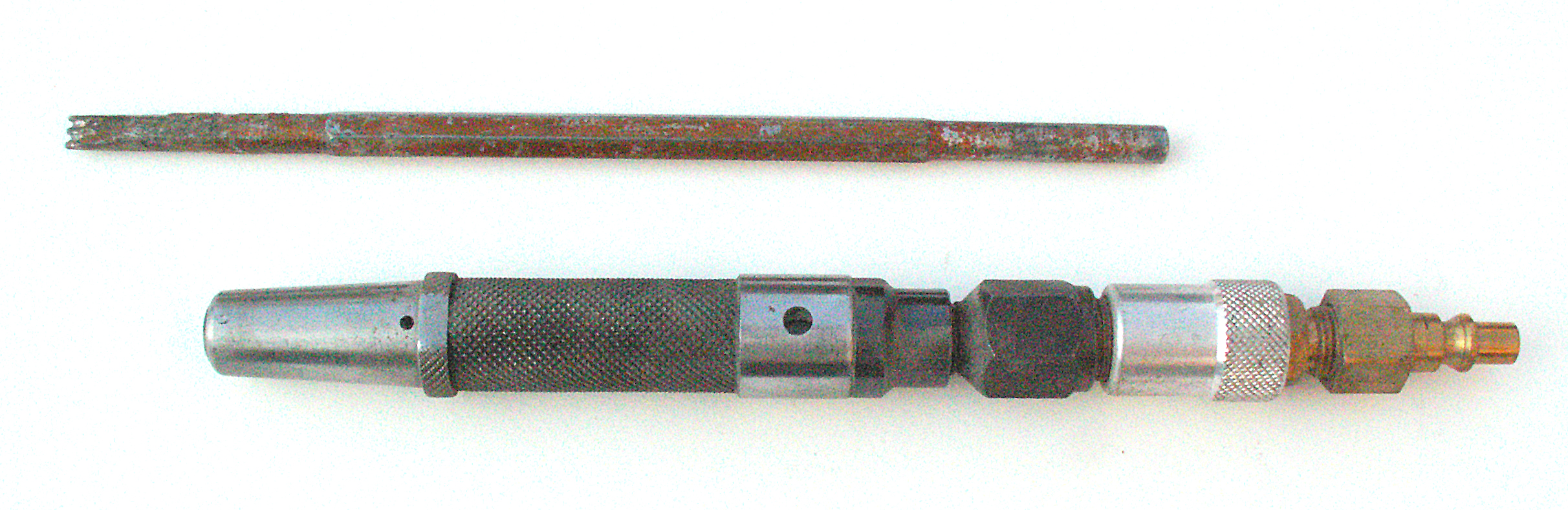
