= List of tool manufacturers =

This is a list of manufacturers of hand tools, hand-held power tools and stationary machines.

Manufacturer	Headquarters	Brands	Products
Altendorf GmbH	Minden, Germany	Altendorf	Table saws, panel saws
Andreas Stihl AG & Company KG	Waiblingen, Germany	Stihl, Viking	Outdoor power equipment
Apex Tool Group (ATG)	Sparks, Maryland, US	Apex Fastening Tools, Belzer, Campbell, Cleco, Crescent, Delta, Dotco, Erem, Gearwrench, HKP, Jacobs, Jobox, Lufkin, Nicholson, Recoules Quakenbush, SATA, Weller, Wiss, Xcelite	Adjustable wrenches, industrial hand tools, power tools
Atlas Copco	Stockholm, Sweden	Atlas Copco, Chicago Pneumatic, Edwards, Desoutter	Various
Bahco	Paris, France	Bahco	Various
Chang Type Industrial Co., Ltd.	Ho-li, Taichung County, Taiwan	Delta Machinery	Woodworking saws
Channellock	Meadville, Pennsylvania	Channellock	Adjustable pliers, hand tools
Diamond Products	Elyria, Ohio, US	Core Bore, Core Cut, Core Prep, Core Vac, Tyrolit	Cutting, abrading, boring tools
Einhell	Landau an der Isar, Germany	Einhell	Power tools, garden equipment
Elliott Tool Technologies	Dayton, Ohio, US		Tubing tools, metal finishing
Emerson Electric		Ridgid, Proteam, Workshop	Various
Fein	Stuttgart, Germany	Fein	Hand-held power tools and shop vacuum cleaners
Flex-Elektrowerkzeuge	Germany	FLEX	Hand-held power tools
Fortive	Everett, Washington, US	Fluke, AMMCO, Coats, Matco	Hand tools, air tools, power tools, diagnostic tools, assorted automotive tools
Gedore	Remscheid, Germany	Gedore	Hand tools
Gray Tools	Toronto, Ontario, Canada	Gray Tools, Dynamic	Industrial hand tools
Griffon Corporation		Ames True Temper	Outdoor hand tools
Hangzhou GreatStar Industrial	Hangzhou, China	Arrow, DuraTech, Goldblatt, SK Hand Tools, Workpro, others	Hand tools, cordless power tools
Hilti	Schaan, Liechtenstein	Hilti	Drills, hammer drills, diamond drilling, direct fastening, installation systems, measuring tools
Husqvarna Group	Sweden	Husqvarna, Weed Eater, Poulan, McCulloch, others	Outdoor power equipment
Ideal Industries	Sycamore, Illinois, US	Western Forge, Pratt-Read	Hand tools
Illinois Tool Works		Paslode, Ramset, Redhead, others	Fastening tools
Ingersoll-Rand	Swords, County Dublin, Ireland	Ingersoll-Rand, others	Air tools
King Dick Tools	Birmingham United Kingdom	King Dick	Mechanics tools, engineers tools
Klein Tools	Lincolnshire, Illinois, US	Klein Tools	Pliers, screwdrivers, nut drivers, wire pulling and stripping tools, crimping tools, scissors, snips, shears, cable and bolt cutters, conduit benders, personal protective equipment, tool bags for the electrical trade
Knipex	Wuppertal, Germany	Knipex	Pliers
Koki Holdings	Tokyo, Japan	HiKoki, Metabo, Metabo HPT, Carat, Sankyo Diamond Tools	Hand-held power tools and stationary machines
KWH Group	Vaasa, Finland	Mirka	Sanders, vacuums
Lee Valley Tools	Ottawa, Ontario, Canada	Veritas	Planes, router tables, measuring tools, sharpening equipment
Lie-Nielsen Toolworks	Warren, Maine, US	Lie-Nielsen	Hand tools and planes
Mafell	Oberndorf am Neckar, Germany	Mafell	Hand-held power tools
Makita	Anjō, Japan	Makita, Maktec	Hand-held power tools
OLFA	Osaka, Japan	OLFA	Cutting tools
Panasonic	Osaka, Japan	Panasonic	Hand-held power tools
Positec	Suzhou, China	WORX, Rockwell Tools, Erbauer, Bauker	Power tools, garden tools
Robert Bosch GmbH	Germany	Bosch, Dremel, Rotozip	Hand-held power tools, table saws, rotary tools
Sandvik	Sweden	Sandvik	Cutting tools
Snap-on	Wisconsin, US	Snap-on, Bahco, Blue-Point, Williams, CDI Torque Products, Sun diagnostic tools in Europe and Brazil	Hand tools, air tools, power tools, diagnostic tools, assorted automotive tools
Sortimo	Zusmarshausen, Germany	Sortimo	In-vehicle equipment, storage system for parts and tools
Stanley Black & Decker	Connecticut, US	Black & Decker, DeVilbiss Air Power, DeWalt, Facom, Porter-Cable, Bostitch, Mac Tools, Proto, Blackhawk, Sidchrome, Stanley Hand Tools, Craftsman, Irwin, Lennox / American Saw and Manufacturing Company	Hand-held power tools, table saws, stationary tools, clamps, vises, planes, chisels
TTI	Hong Kong	Milwaukee, Ryobi, Homelite, Hoover, Vax, Bissell, Dirt Devil.	Hand-held power tools
TTS Tooltechnic Systems	Wendlingen, Germany	Festool, Tanos, SawStop	Hand-held power tools, dust extraction tools, workplace organization
United Pacific Industries Ltd		Spear & Jackson	Hand tools and garden tools
Wera Werk Hermann Werner GmbH & Co. KG	Wuppertal, Germany	Wera Tools	Drivers, driver bits, other hand tools
Werner Co.	Itasca, Illinois, US	Werner, Knaack, Weather Guard	Ladders, other

== See also ==
- List of tools and equipment
