= Makita AWS =

System for remotely starting vacuum cleaners

Makita Auto-Start Wireless System (AWS, 2017‒), Festool Autostart (2018‒) and Bosch Wireless Auto-Start (2024‒) are Bluetooth-based systems for remotely starting industrial vacuum cleaners from power tools. Several power tools, cordless battery packs, and industrial vacuum cleaners ship with wireless connectivity, mostly using Bluetooth Low Energy to communicate, but as of 2024 the systems remained incompatible between different brands.

Initial support in 2007 was for data logging monitored torque values; followed in 2015 by adding Bluetooth low energy beacons into power tools for asset tracking, battery status monitoring, and configuration via a mobile app. Since 2017 onwards various power tools have added support for remote starting or stopping of a dust collector (vacuum cleaner) via Bluetooth; although only between tools from the same manufacturer or group of companies.

== Vacuum control ==
Brand names for the remote starting of a vacuum cleaner include Makita Auto-Start Wireless System (AWS), and DeWalt Wireless Tool Control; plus designs from Festool, and HiKoki. Metabo and Flex use the Cordless Control proprietary standard originally developed by Starmix.

== Overview ==
Although power tools may advertise some form of wireless or Bluetooth support, this may only be a limited subset of features, such as only for configuration or asset tracking, or only for remote control of dust extraction.

Wireless support in Power Tools (2021)
Vendor	Branding	Radio	Functions	Remote start/stop	
Vendor	Branding	Radio	Functions	Activation	Dust extractor (vacuum)
Makita	Torque Tracer	Bluetooth	Data logging	Tool trigger (integrated)	
Makita	Auto-start Wireless System	Bluetooth Low Energy	Remote start/stop (+WUT01 module)	Tool trigger	Vacuum (+WUT01 module); WUT02 resistive load
Festool	Autostart	Bluetooth Low Energy	Remote start/stop	18V battery; Manual remote (CT-F)	Integrated; Retro-fit control panel
Festool	Autostart	Bluetooth Low Energy	Configuration, battery status		
HiKoki	Wireless Linking	Bluetooth Low Energy	Remote start/stop	18V/36V battery (BSL36A18B, BSL36B18B); Tool trigger (C3605DA, C3605DYA)	Integrated (RP3608DB)
Bosch	Connected-Ready	Bluetooth Low Energy	Configuration, status (+GCY30-4 module)		
Bosch	Tool-to-Tool	Bluetooth Low Energy	Remote start/stop (+GCY42 module)	Tool trigger	
Bosch	Wireless Auto-Start	Bluetooth Low Energy	Remote start/stop	Vibration trigger (GCT 30-42)	Integrated (GAS 18V-12 MC); Resistive load (GCA 30-42)
Milwaukee	One-Key	Bluetooth Low Energy	Configuration, status, asset tracking, locking		
Black+Decker	SmarTech	Bluetooth Low Energy	Battery status, locking		
Ridgid	Octane	Bluetooth Low Energy	Battery status, locking		
Hilti		Bluetooth Low Energy	Remote start/stop	Manual toggle (IC-RM)	Retro-fit control panel (IC-RC)
DeWalt	Tool Connect	Bluetooth Low Energy	Configuration, status, asset tracking		
DeWalt	Wireless Tool Connect	433 MHz	Remote start/stop	Tool trigger (integrated); Keyfob	Integrated
Starmix (Electrostar)	Cordless Control	2.4 GHz (Zigbee)	Remote start/stop	Vibration trigger; Manual toggle	Mains relay; Retro-fit control panel
Metabo	Cordless Control	2.4 GHz (Zigbee)	Remote start/stop	Vibration trigger; Manual toggle	Mains relay; Retro-fit control panel
Flex	Cordless Control	2.4 GHz (Zigbee)	Remote start/stop	Vibration trigger; Manual toggle	Mains relay; Retro-fit control panel
Flex	VCE CControl	2.4 GHz (Zigbee)	Remote start/stop	Vibration trigger; Manual toggle	Mains relay

As of 2021, the Bluetooth systems were incompatible between manufacturers, with each brand requiring its own application to be downloaded and no support for cross-vendor applications.

== Implementations ==
=== Black & Decker ===
In 2016 Black & Decker announced the introduction of Bluetooth support in battery packs. These Black & Decker Smartech batteries feature a Bluetooth connection that allows remotely displaying the charge level, locating, or locking a battery pack.

=== Bosch ===
Bosch Professional series power tools ending with "C" (for Connectivity) in the model name feature a removable circular opening into which a Bluetooth module can be fitted. As of 2021 two add-on Bluetooth modules were available:

- GCY 30-4 module (supporting Bluetooth 4.1)
- GCY 42 upgraded module (supporting Bluetooth 4.2), including Tool-to-Tool communication.

In 2015 Bosch had released an attachable tracking beacon called TrackTag.

=== Dewalt ===
DeWalt have shipped two separate and incompatible wireless systems: one for status, tracking and configuration; and one for remote vacuum activation.

==== Tool Connect ====
The first system called Tool Connect was released in 2015 and uses Bluetooth Low Energy for asset tracking, configuration of tools and monitoring of battery state. Bluetooth design and application development was undertaken by Laird Connectivity.

DeWalt produced two battery designs with Tool Connect Bluetooth transmitters built in. This allows reading battery status, temperature, firmware/hardware version, and to control locking/disabling when out of range.

DeWalt additionally produced three models of drills (DCD792, DCD797, DCD997) and two impact drivers (DCF888, DCF906) with a Bluetooth module built-in allowing user configuration of maximum RPM (rotation speed) and LED illumination.

For tracking, Dewalt added a retro-fit add-on pass-through "shoe" that connected between the battery and tool (DCE040), plus screw-on external tags (DCE041) with a plan from 2022 to move to a built-in slot for adding a Bluetooth tracking module (DCE042).

==== Wireless Tool Connect ====
The second Dewalt system is branded as Wireless Tool Control and uses a 433 MHz transmitter inside tools, or a wrist-mounted remote control in combination with a built-in receiver on some vacuum cleaners. Only one tool or remote can be paired to a vacuum cleaner at a time, previous pairings are overridden.

As of 2020 the range of compatible tools included a 60-volt SDS drill which could be remotely linked to a vacuum cleaner.

The DeWalt WTC operates at ~433.92 MHz in the LPD433 band—the same ISM radio band also used for remote keyless systems and remote door locks.

=== Festool ===
In April 2018 Festool released a system that uses a Bluetooth-based control panel that is retro-fitted into vacuum cleaners. The vacuum dust extractor is then activated by special batteries packs which can receive the tool run status from compatible tools and forward this over Bluetooth. The Festool system can also be activated by a small remote transmitter that is affixed to the end of the vacuum hose, allowing operation with all brands of power tools.

=== Hikoki ===
As of 2019, Hikoki had announced the RP3608DB vacuum cleaner, and a circular saw that could communicate via Bluetooth.

=== Hilti ===
Hilti produce a series of construction vacuum cleaners with optional remote control via Bluetooth.

=== Makita ===
==== Torque Tracer ====
By 2010 Makita was producing a series of Bluetooth-equipped assembly tools marketed as Torque Tracer capable of transmitting the measured torque and angle applied to each fastening. Makita had applied for the Torque Tracer trademark in 2007.

==== Auto-Start Wireless System ====
Makita Auto-Start Wireless System (AWS) is a wireless communication method used between power tools and dust collection devices/vacuum cleaners, released by Makita in 2017.

The system uses Bluetooth Low Energy (BLE). Tool and vacuum devices must first paired, but can also later be unpaired.

As of 2017, a miter saw, plunge saw, rotary hammer drill, and an angle grinder were available that could send triggers via AWS. By 2019, a drywall sander was available.

Beginning in 2019, Makita started produce a universal adaptor that could be connected to the automatic pass-through AC mains electricity port of existing vacuum cleaners.

===== Implementation =====
The same WUT01 Bluetooth module is used in all tools. When inserted into a compatible vacuum cleaner, or the WUT02 "Universal" resistive-load adapter the module same invisible, in listening mode.

When the WUT01 Bluetooth module is inserted into a compatible tool, a Bluetooth Low Energy advertising message is broadcast approximately ten times per second; this contains the status of the tool inserted into a manufacturer specific packet:

Makita Bluetooth advertisements
Manufacturer specific	State	Notes	Module LED status
05 FF FC 33 03 05	poweron	after power on, before Bluetooth activation	none
05 FF FD 33 06 06	initialised	slow blinking blue, first click only	blue (flashing)
05 FF FC 33 03 06	waiting	slow blinking blue - normal status quo	blue (flashing)
05 FF FD AA 03 06	trigger	tool activated	blue (solid)
05 FF FF 33 0C 07	pairing	flashing green	green (flashing)
05 FF EF 33 18 08	unpair	flashing red, then press	red (flashing)

During pairing, the tool-side module must advertise a Generic Attribute Profile (GATT) endpoint used to exchange MAC addresses during the pairing process.

===== Pairing =====
Multiple tools can be paired to a single vacuum cleaner; if any of the paired tools are used, the vacuum cleaner will start-up, even if the vacuum hose is not connected to that tool. The same replaceable communications module is used for both ends of the connection.

Pairing between a tool and dust extraction is achieved by pressing a button on both devices for 3 seconds. Unpairing a specific pair of devices is achieved by pressing a button on both devices for 6 seconds. Resetting an individual AWS transmitter/receiver by removing all previous pairings is achieved by pressing the same button for 6 seconds, twice.

=== Milwaukee ===
By the end of 2015 Milwaukee Electric Tool were supplying tools and battery packs with One-key support, allowing monitoring of battery status and custom tool settings configuration.

By 2016, three tools were being offered with Bluetooth tracking built-in, for approximately €20 extra per tool.

=== Ridgid ===
During 2018 Ridgid started selling Octane battery packs with Bluetooth transmitters built-in. The battery packs can transmit the battery charge percentage status and temperature. Battery capacities are 3.0 Ah (AC840088), 6.0 Ah (R8400806) and 9.0 Ah (R8400809).
