= Mortiser =

Specialized woodworking machine

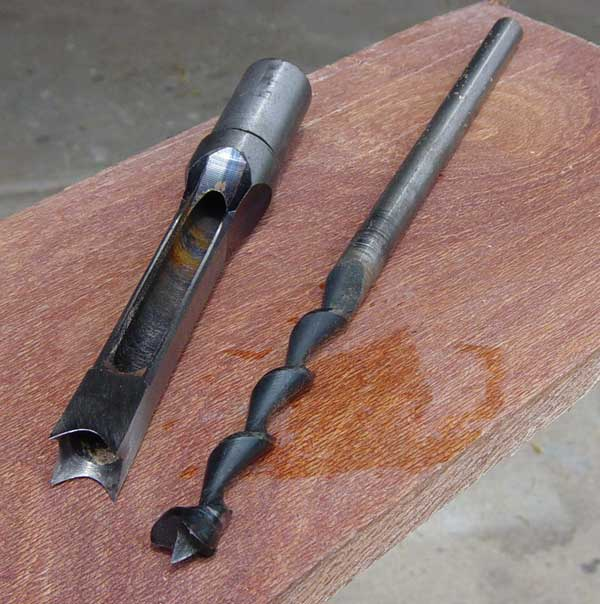
Hollow mortising chisel and bit

A mortiser or morticer is a specialized woodworking machine used to cut square or rectangular holes in a piece of lumber (timber), such as a mortise in a mortise and tenon joint.

== Square chisel mortiser ==
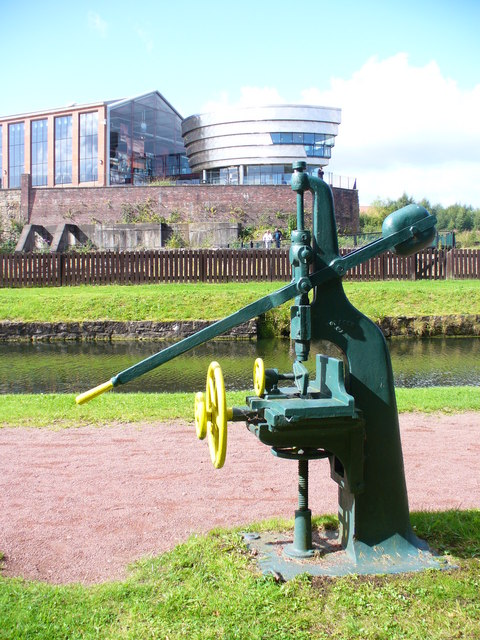
Lever mortising machine, now disused and placed as a monument

The square chisel mortiser (also called hollow chisel mortiser), similar to a drill press in many respects, combines the cutting of a four-sided chisel with the action of a drill bit in the center. The bit clears out most of the material to be removed, and the chisel ensures the edges are straight and clean. This device was invented in 1874 by Robert and Ralph Greenlee (founders of the Greenlee Company).

The first square chisel lever mortisers were purely manual and relied on the operator pulling down on a large lever to push the chisel through the timber. An improvement was to place a rotating cylindrical auger inside a hollow chisel. This helps to clear chips up the centre of the chisel. As electric power became easily available, the auger developed as a drill bit and became the main means of removing waste timber from the mortise. These mortisers now used much shorter hand levers, as the manual work was only in cleaning up the mortise to be square-cornered.

Square chisel mortising bits can also be fitted to normal drill presses using a mortising attachment.

The Greenlee Company still manufactures mortisers, as do a large number of other power tool manufacturers. It is a common tool in the woodshop of professional woodworkers, but because of its specialized nature, many amateur woodworkers would not make enough use of it to justify the cost and space this tool takes up in the woodshop. Some smaller and less expensive models, suitable for cutting only narrow mortises are available.

== Horizontal mortiser (slot mortiser) ==
A more recent innovation is the horizontal mortiser, which incorporates a router mounted statically on its side with the workpiece clamped to a multi-axis sliding table. This type of mortiser can produce either traditional mortise and tenon pairs, however it excels at floating (or 'loose') tenons. A floating tenon is where both the pieces of wood that are to be joined have aligned mortises cut into them and a separate piece of wood is milled into a fitted tenon which is glued into the two mortises.

== Chain mortiser ==
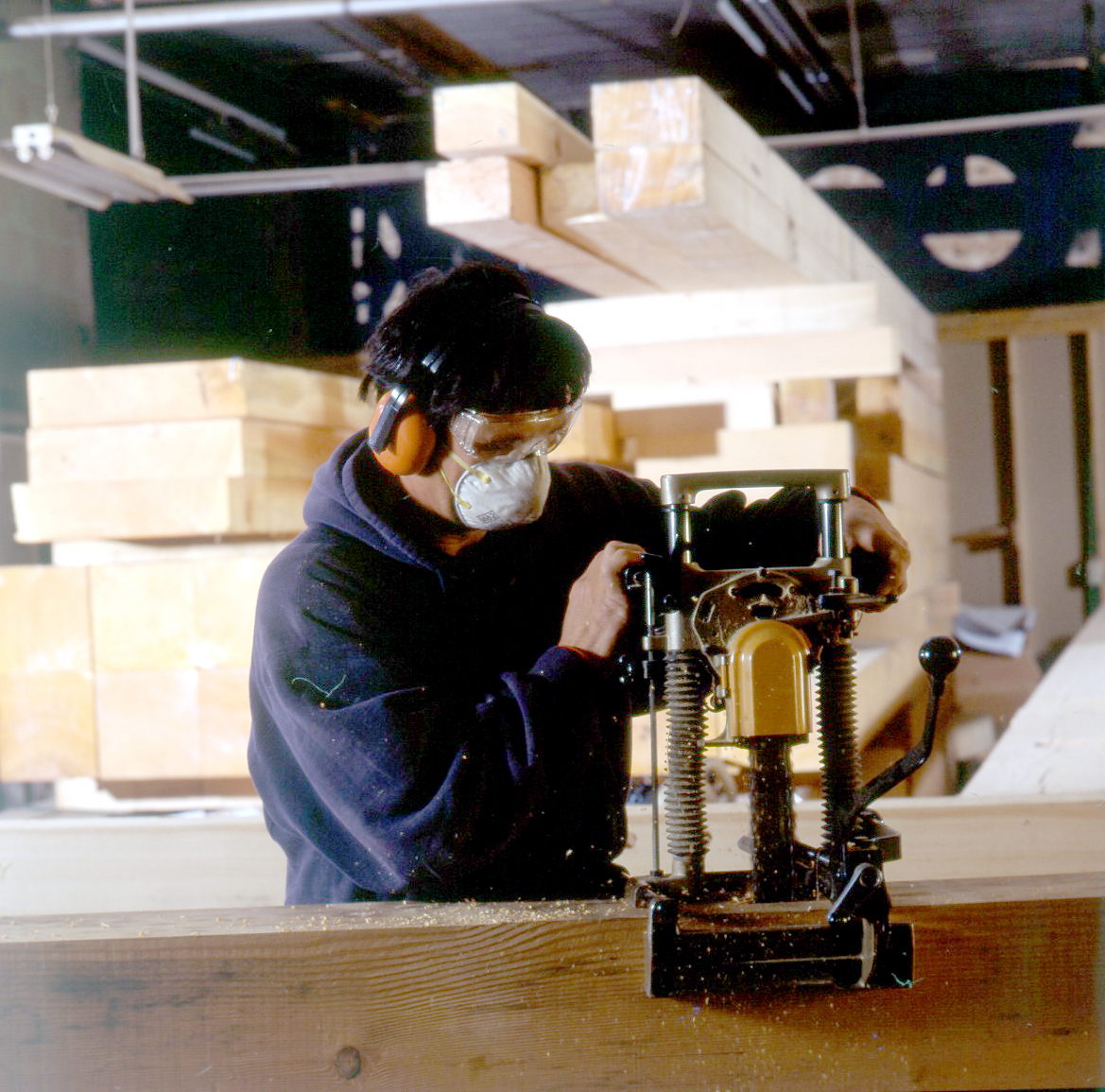
A chain mortiser used in timber framing

For cutting larger mortises such as those used in timber frame construction, chain mortisers are commonly used. A chain with cutters (similar to a chainsaw chain) rotating within a frame clamped to the work is successively plunged into the workpiece to mortise out the required volume. The Makita 7104L is such a tool. These chains are made in varying widths, with numbers of chains in parallel. The teeth are often solid or have tungsten carbide tips. They are thus very expensive, sometimes as much as the rest of the mortiser.

== Other methods of cutting mortises ==
The Reuleaux triangle rotating inside a constant sized square

Traditionally, a mortise would be cut by hand, using a chisel and mallet. However, due to the precision of fit required for a mortise and tenon joint, this can be a difficult and time-consuming task.

Other tools such as a router could be used for the task, but the router usually requires special attachments, jigs or templates and the router bit leaves rounded corners that might need to be squared by hand with a chisel. Alternatively, the tenon can be rounded with a rasp to achieve an equally strong joint.

For cutting small mortises, a normal drill bit can be used. However, for larger mortises, a common type of bit in modern mortisers is a Harry Watt square drill bit, in which a bit with a Reuleaux triangle cross section is allowed to "wobble" while it rotates within a square with rounded corners. This type of bit removes all but the corners of the material to be removed, leaving very little to be cut by the chisel.

The Festool Domino is an electric hand tools that can cut mortices for floating tenons “dominos.” In 2026 Kreg announced they will bring a machine to market to cut mortices for loose tenons.

== See also ==
- Rotary broaching, a method of drilling square holes in steel.
