= Lesnaya Industriya =

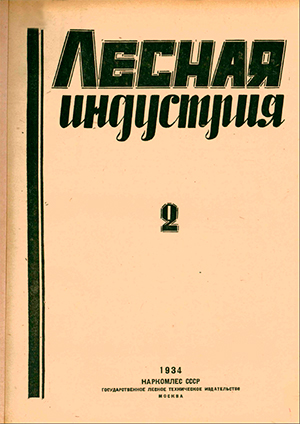
- Editorial Director: Alexei Bogatyrev
- Categories: Woodworking
- Frequency: Monthly
- Total circulation (2014): 10,000
- First issue: March 11, 1934
- Company: Unified Information Systems LLC
- Country: Russia
- Based in: Moscow
- Language: Russian
- Website: www.lesindustry.ru

Lesnaya Industriya (Russian: Лесная индустрия) is a Russian monthly woodworking magazine published in Moscow.

Since 2003 Lesnaya Industriya is printed 10 issues (8 issues since 2021 ) per year with a circulation of 10,000 items. The journal has 60 full color pages and four covers.

The first issue of Lesnaya Industriya journal was published in February 1934 year. Among advertisers there were such companies as Otto J. Faber and Stahl & Zoon (Netherlands), Luis Brenta (Belgium), Georg Ott, Mafell GmbH and Maschinenfabrik Kiessling (Germany), Ross Carrier Co. (USA; in 1953, the Ross Carrier was acquired by Clark Equipment Company). In those years, the magazine was black-and-white.

Since 2007 Lesnaya Industriya publishes annual financial rating of the biggest companies in Russian forest based industry with revenues, profits, profitability and growth rate.

In 2014, Lesnaya Industriya introduced special sections that are published four times a year: Furniture production, Wooden panels, Biofuel and Wood raw materials. Special section consists of a review of the market, expert opinions regarding changes in the relevant legislation, important developments in the furniture, wooden panels, biofuel market or logs harvesting, as well as a digest of new technologies.
