= Dolmar =

German company

Makita Engineering Germany GmbH
- Company type: GmbH
- Industry: Forestry equipment, Landscape maintenance
- Founded: 1927; 99 years ago
- Headquarters: Hamburg, Germany
- Products: Industrial Chainsaws, String trimmers, and Leaf blowers
- Parent: Makita
- Website: dolmar.de

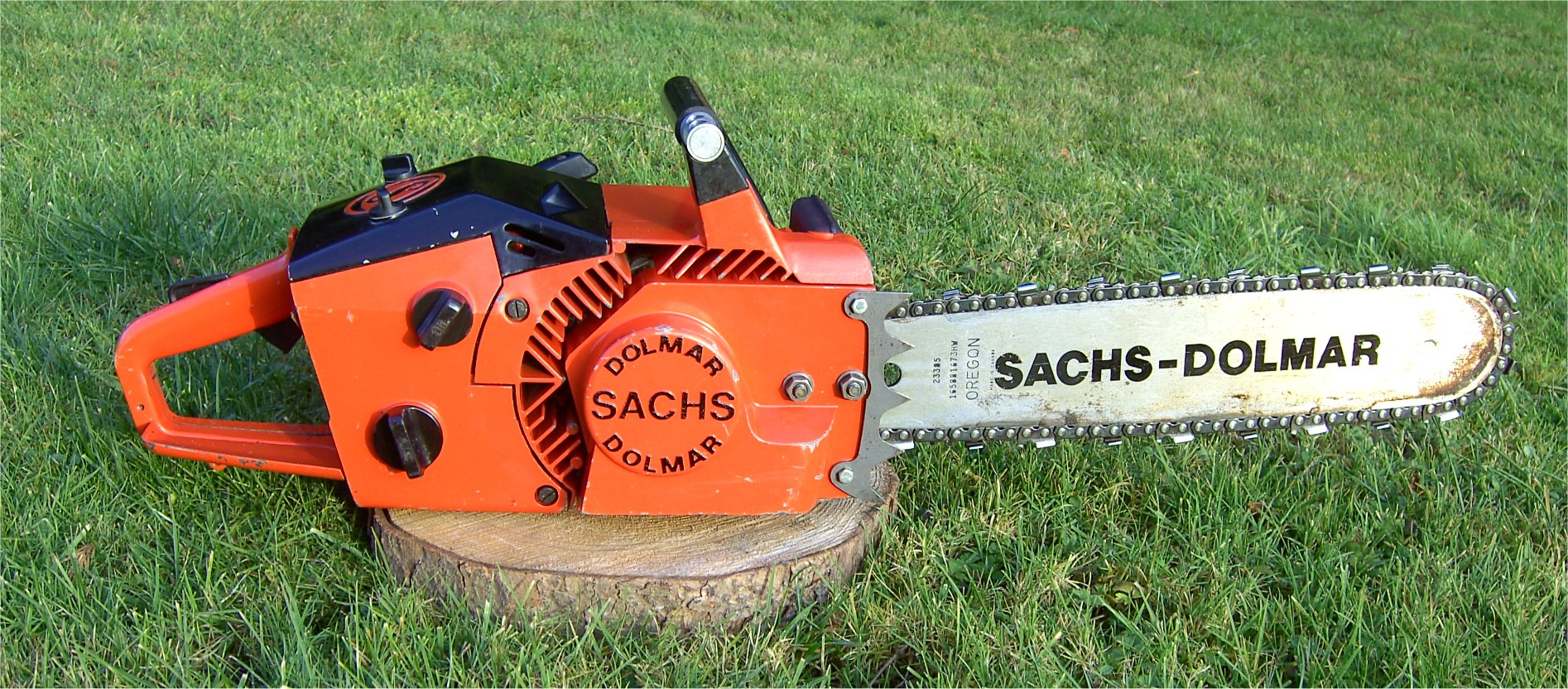
Dolmar chainsaw

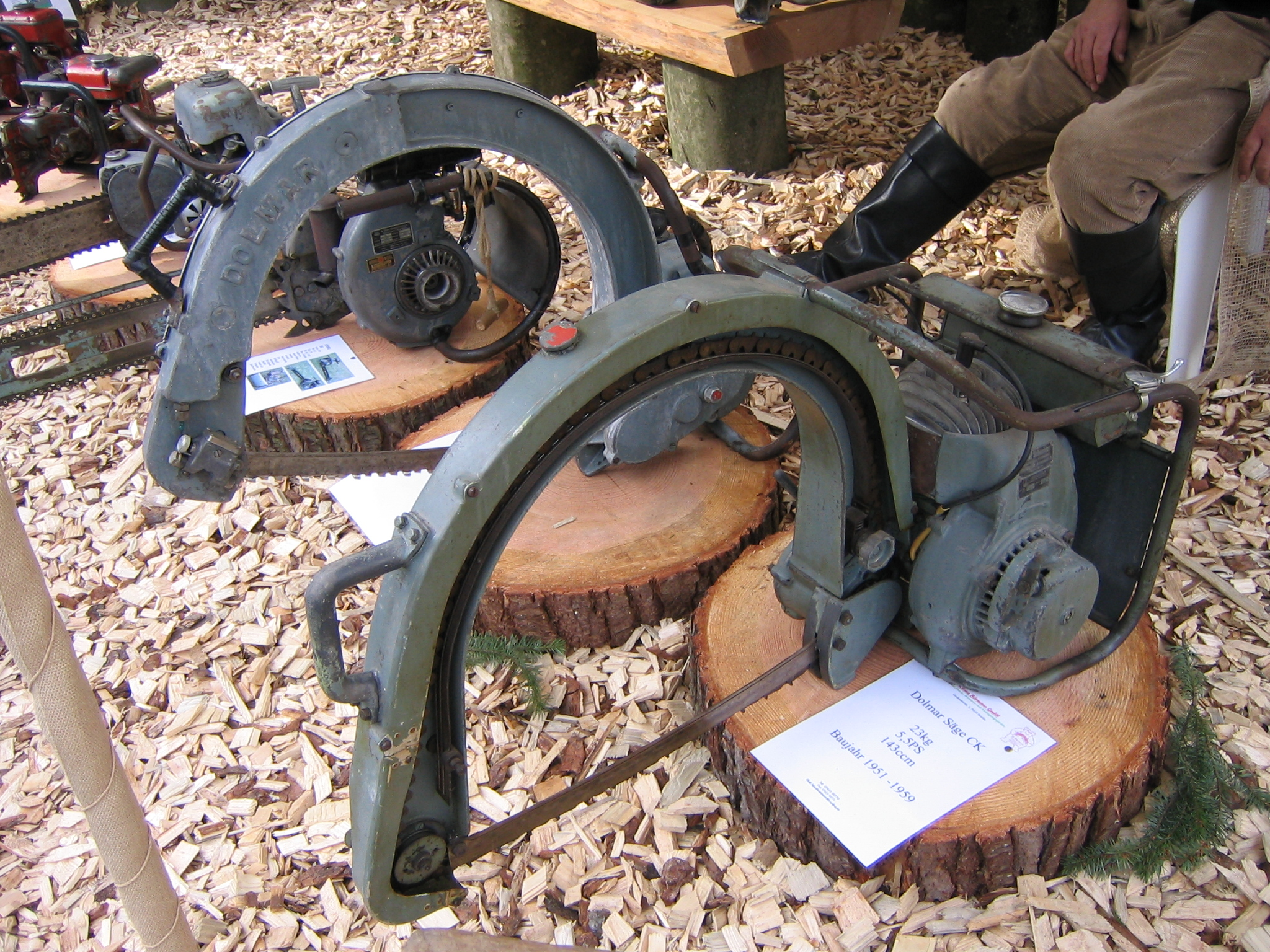
1950s log bucking bandsaws

Makita Engineering Germany GmbH (Dolmar) is one of the oldest manufacturers of portable gasoline chainsaws and is headquartered in Hamburg, Germany. The company founder, Emil Lerp, developed in 1927 the "type A" saw, which weighed 125 lb (57 kg) and required two men to operate. It was tested on Mount Dolmar in the Thüringer forest and the company took its name from the test site.

In 1991 the company was acquired by Japanese tool manufacturer Makita.
