= Norbert Niemann =

German writer (born 1961)

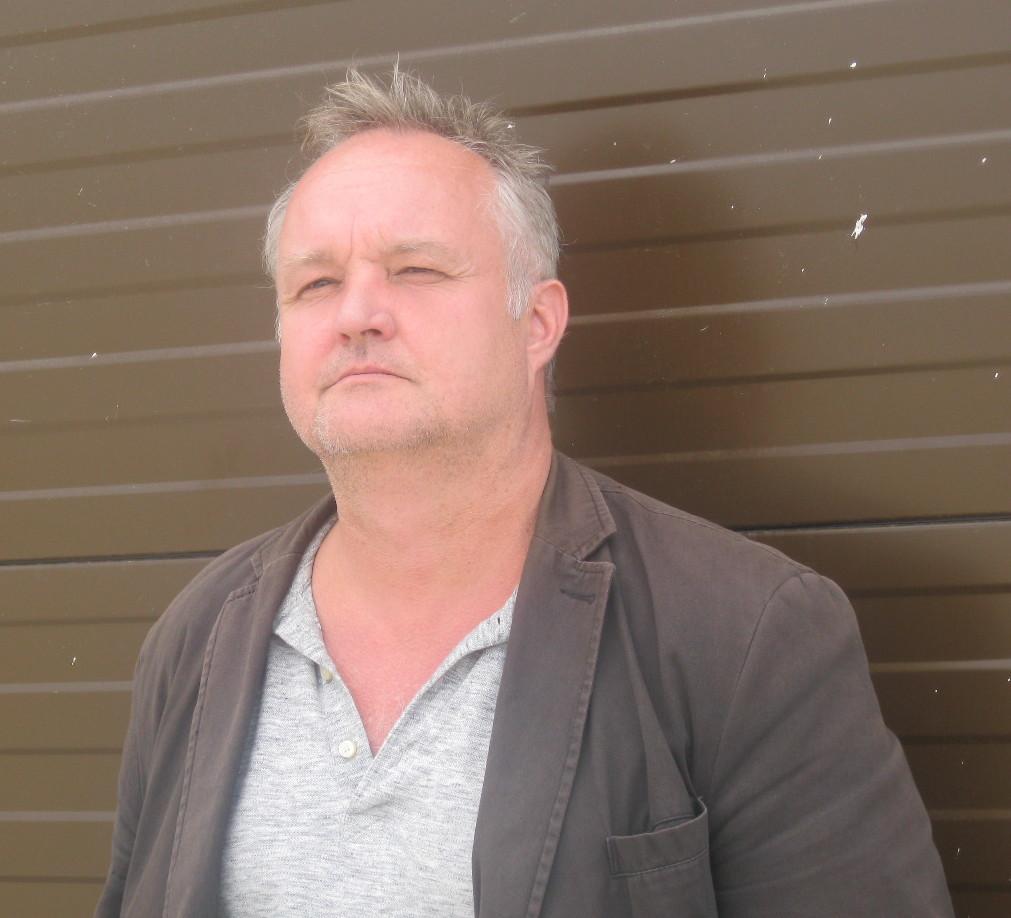

Norbert Niemann (born 20 May 1961, in Landau an der Isar) is a German writer.

== Life ==
He grew up in Niederbayern. He studied literature, musicology and modern history at the University of Regensburg, and at LMU Munich. From 1983 to 1985, during his studies at the University of Regensburg, Niemann was instrumentalist and vocalist of the New Wave band Thieves of the night, for whom he also composed and wrote lyrics for the first time. Together with authors of the same age, such as Marcel Beyer and Durs Grünbein, Niemann became an associate and editor of the Literaturzeitschrift Konzepte, as well as a member of the group "Schöner Wohnen". For his novel Die Einzigen (Berlin Verlag), some of the recordings of "Diebe der Nacht" were re-edited. Niemann obtained the academic degree of the Magister Artium in 1989 with a work on New Subjectivity. Since 1997, he has lived with his family as a freelance writer in Chieming am Chiemsee.

Niemann is the author of numerous essays and critiques as well as the author of four time-romances. His social criticism and his poetics of changing narrative techniques are influenced, among other things, by Adorno's and Horkheimer's Dialectics of Enlightenment, Gilles Deleuze and Michel Foucault. Niemann's analytical approach is classified by the criticism in the succession of Robert Musil, Joseph Roth, Thomas Mann, or Arthur Schnitzler.

== Awards ==
Niemann received the Ingeborg Bachmann Prize in Klagenfurt in 1997, the Bavarian State Prize for Literature in 1998, and the Clemens Brentano Prize of the City of Heidelberg in 1999. He received the International Music Theater Now Award in 2016 for his stage adaptation of the musicological theater piece Musicophilia (for Oliver Sacks), and for his novel "Die Einzigen" the New York scholarship of the German Literary Fund. From 2006 to 2014, he was deputy chairman of the district of Bavaria of the Association of German Writers (VS), and is a member of the PEN Center in Germany. Niemann regularly takes part in the Lübeck Literary Meeting. He received the Carl Amery Literary Prize in 2015. Since the summer of 2015, he has been a member of the Bavarian Academy of Fine Arts.

== Works ==
=== Novels ===
- Wie man’s nimmt. Carl Hanser, Munich 1998, ISBN 3-446-19288-3.
- Schule der Gewalt. Carl Hanser, Munich 2001, ISBN 3-446-20056-8.
- Willkommen neue Träume. Carl Hanser, Munich 2008, ISBN 978-3-446-20994-7.
- Die Einzigen. Berlin Verlag, Berlin 2014, ISBN 978-3-8270-1253-1.

=== Editor ===
- Inventur. Deutsches Lesebuch 1945–2003. Munich [i. a.] 2003, 409 Seiten. (together with Eberhard Rathgeb)
- Keine Lust auf Untergang. Gegen eine Trivialisierung der Gesellschaft. Langen Müller, Munich 2010, 192 Seiten. (together with Thomas Kraft)

=== Stories ===
- "Sankt Martin. Eine Geschichte vom Sterben, Erzählung," in: Verena Auffermann (Hrsg.): Beste Deutsche Erzähler 2002, Deutsche Verlags-Anstalt, Stuttgart, Munich 2002, Seiten 14–41.
- "Nächtliche Touren im Labyrinth der Altstadt. Ein Wiedersehen mit Regensburg nach zwanzig Jahren," in: Konrad Maria Färber (Hrsg.): Regensburg – Das Gedächtnis Europas, Regensburger Almanach 2008, MZ Buchverlag, Regensburg 2008, Seiten 93–96.
- Kleine Transporter. Texte und Zeichnungen, Bamberg, Edition Villa Concordia 2010, 106 Seiten (together with Martin Schmidt)
- "Burghausen Tag und Nacht (Eine Geisterfahrt). Schreiben mit der Klasse 8a der Hauptschule an der Ichostraße" in Munich, Kurzroman in: Franziska Sperr (Hrsg.): Klasse Geschichten. Schüler und Autoren entwickeln gemeinsam eine Geschichte, Bund-Verlag, Frankfurt am Main 2012, Seiten 107–134.
