= Power tool =

Tool that uses an additional power source

A power tool is a tool that is actuated by an additional power source and mechanism other than the solely manual labor used with hand tools. The most common types of power tools use electric motors. Internal combustion engines and compressed air are also commonly used. Tools directly driven by animal power are not generally considered power tools. Power tools can produce large amounts of particulates, including ultrafine particles. Airborne particulate matter is a Group 1 carcinogen.

== Uses ==
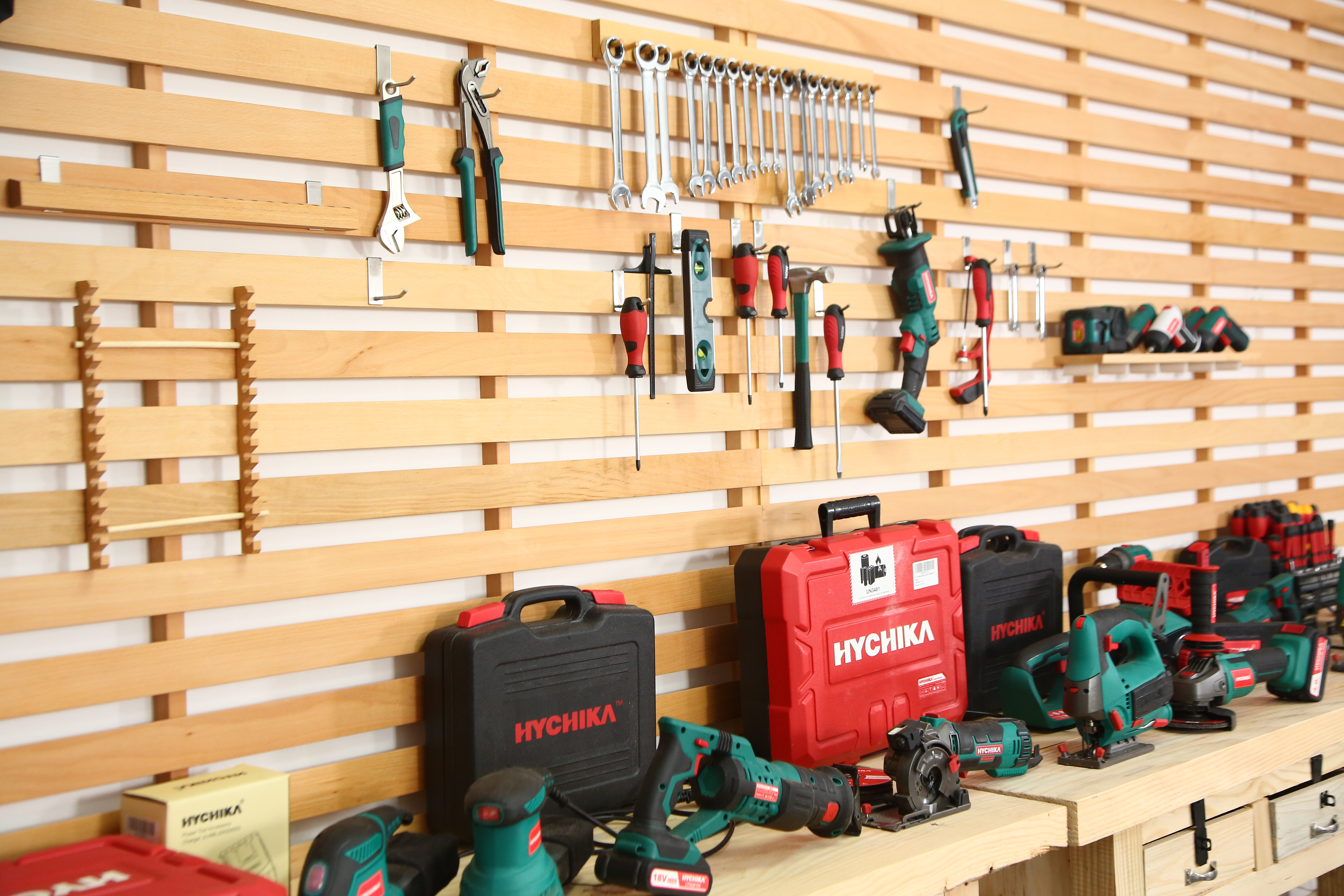
Diverse power tools

Power tools are used in industry, in construction, in renovation, in the garden, for housework tasks such as cooking, cleaning, and around the house for purposes of driving (fasteners), drilling, cutting, shaping, sanding, grinding, routing, polishing, painting, metalworking, woodworking, heating and more.

Using hand and power tools to cut plastic materials during construction activities can generate microplastics. Airborne microplastics is a type of particulates. Further studies are needed "on the different types of cutting tools and their associated MP production".

== Classification ==
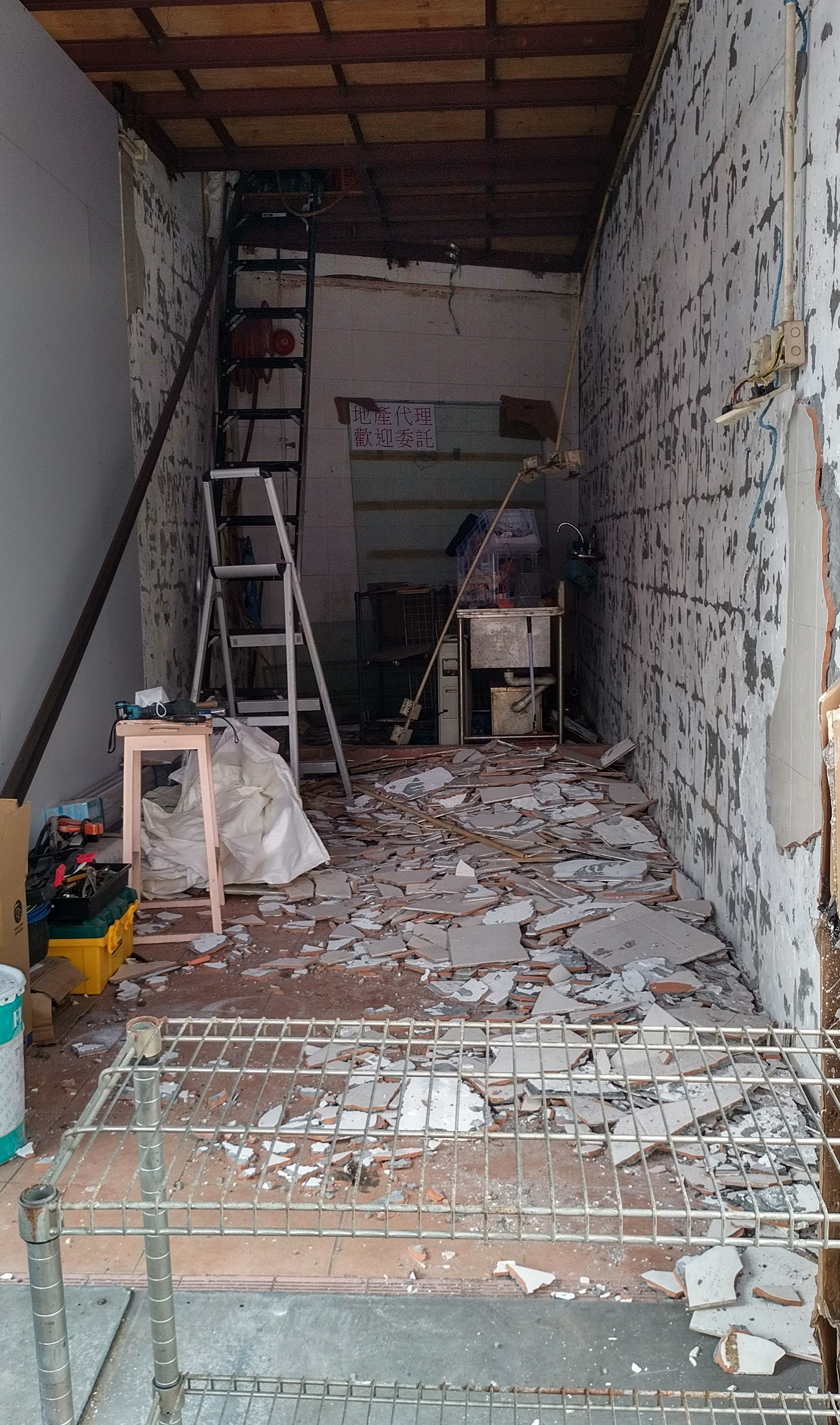
A shop under renovation (power tools can be seen on the left of the photo).

Power tools are classified as either stationary or portable, where portable means hand-held. Portable power tools have obvious advantages in mobility. Stationary power tools, however, often have advantages in speed and precision. A typical table saw, for instance, not only cuts faster than a regular hand saw, but the cuts are smoother, straighter, and more square than what is normally achievable with a hand-held power saw. Some stationary power tools can produce objects that cannot be made in any other way. Lathes, for example, produce truly round objects.

Stationary power tools for metalworking are usually called machine tools. The term machine tool is not usually applied to stationary power tools for woodworking, although such usage is occasionally heard, and in some cases, such as drill presses and bench grinders, exactly the same tool is used for both woodworking and metalworking.

== Health impact ==
While hand-held power tools are helpful, they also produce large amounts of noise, vibrations and particulates including ultrafine particles.

Airborne particulate matter is a Group 1 carcinogen. Particulates are the most harmful form (other than ultra-fines) of air pollution as they can penetrate deep into the lungs and brain from blood streams, causing health problems such as heart disease, lung disease, and premature death. There is no safe level of particulates. A 2013 study concluded that "particulate matter air pollution contributes to lung cancer incidence in Europe". Worldwide, exposure to PM_{2.5} contributed to 4.1 million deaths from heart disease, stroke, lung cancer, chronic lung disease, and respiratory infections in 2016. Overall, ambient particulate matter is one of the leading risk factor for premature death globally.

Many construction tasks create dust. High dust levels are caused by one of more the following:

A high dust level example.

- equipment – using high energy tools, such as cut-off saws, grinders, wall chasers and grit blasters produce a lot of dust in a very short time
- work method – dry sweeping can make a lot of dust when compared to vacuuming or wet brushing
- work area – the more enclosed a space, the more the dust will build up
- time – the longer you work the more dust there will be

Examples of high dust level tasks include:

- using power tools to cut, grind, drill or prepare a surface
- sanding taped plaster board joints
- dry sweeping

Some industry standards on the size and amount of dust emitted by power tools exist, though it appears that they are not widely known or used globally. Knowing that dust is generated throughout the construction process and can cause serious health hazards, manufacturers are now marketing power tools that are equipped with dust collectors (e.g. HEPA vacuum cleaners) or integrated water delivery system which extract the dust after emission. However, the use of such products is still not common in most places. As of Q1 2024, petrol powered tools are banned in California.

On-tool extraction units mount onto the power tool and trap dust, similar to a vacuum cleaner. In general, such a unit consists of three parts: a hood for collecting dust, a vacuum suction component, and a hose. Choosing the correct on-tool extraction unit must be done with care. For example, the hood must be sized and fit properly otherwise the extraction unit will be ineffective. Additionally, one must consider the nature of the dust (particulate matter) being evacuated. For example, some types of particulate matter may be toxic, while other types may not be.

Using power tools without hearing protection over a long period of time can put a person at risk for hearing loss. The U.S. National Institute for Occupational Safety and Health (NIOSH) has recommended that a person should not be exposed to noise at or above 85 dB, for the sake of hearing loss prevention. Most power tools, including drills, circular saws, belt sanders, and chainsaws, operate at sound levels above the 85 dB limit, some even reaching over 100 dB. NIOSH strongly recommends wearing hearing protection while using these kinds of power tools.

== History ==
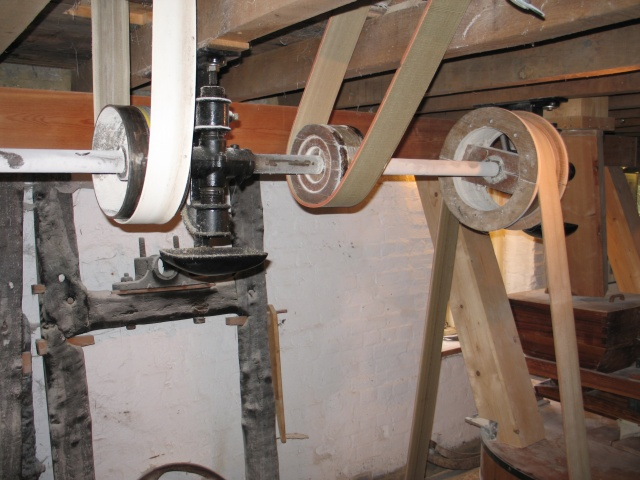
Shaft and belt system

Early Industrial Revolution-era factories had batteries of power tools driven by belts from overhead shafts. The prime power source was a water wheel or (later) a steam engine. The introduction of the electric motor (and electric distribution networks) in the 1880s made possible the self-powered stationary and portable tools we know today. The global market for power tools is $33 billion (in 2016) and estimated to reach $46 billion in 2025.

=== Safety Enhancement ===
Prior to the 1930s, power tools were often housed in cast metal housings. The cast metal housings were heavy, contributing to repetitive use injuries, as well as conductive – often shocking the user. As Henry Ford adapted to the manufacturing needs of World War II, he requested that A. H. Peterson, a tool manufacturer, create a lighter electric drill that was more portable for his assembly line workers. At this point, the Hole-Shooter, a drill that weighed 5 lbs. was created by A. H. Peterson. The Peterson Company eventually went bankrupt after a devastating fire and recession, but the company was auctioned off to A. F. Siebert, a former partner in the Peterson Company, in 1924 and became the Milwaukee Electric Tool Company.

In the early 1930s, companies started to experiment with housings of thermosetting polymer plastics. In 1956, under the influence of Hans Erich Slany, Robert Bosch GmbH was one of the first companies to introduce a power tool housing made of glass filled nylon.

== Energy sources ==
As of 2021, an electric motor is the most popular choice to power stationary tools. Other power sources include steam engines, direct burning of fuels and propellants, such as in powder-actuated tools, or even natural power sources such as wind or moving water. In the past, stationary tools were powered by windmills, water wheels, and steam. Some museums and hobbyists still maintain and operate stationary tools powered by these older power sources. Portable electric tools may be either corded or battery-powered. Compressed air is the customary power source for nailers and paint sprayers. A few tools (called powder-actuated tools) are powered by explosive cartridges. Tools that run on gasoline or gasoline-oil mixes are made for outdoor use; typical examples include most chainsaws and string trimmers. Other tools like blowtorches will burn their fuel externally to generate heat. Compressed air is universally used where there is a possibility of fuel or vapor ignition - such as automotive workshops. Professional level electric tools differ from DIY or 'consumer' tools by being double insulated and not earthed - in fact, they must not be earthed for safety reasons.

=== Battery types ===
Different battery powered power tools often use batteries which are not compatible across brands and models. This may cause vendor lock-in, and results in poor sustainability if and when either the battery, charger, or power tool component fails, resulting in potentially all having to be replaced.

Examples of battery differences include the battery technologies themselves, with nickel-metal hydride (NiMH) and nickel–cadmium batteries (Ni-Cd) being common previously, but as of 2021, lithium-ion batteries have become the de facto standard for new power tools. The voltage is one of the most important factors for battery compatibility. In simple terms, a higher voltage rating on the tool often means that the power tool can deliver more power, with all else being equal. Using a battery with the wrong voltage rating may damage the tool, persons, or surroundings. As of 2021, 18-volt battery packs are the de facto standard in new power tools. The ampere-hour, in simple terms, tells something about how long the power tool can operate before it needs to be recharged. If comparing two batteries with the same battery technology and same voltage rating, a battery with twice the amp hour rating should last about twice as long. In practice there may however be some variations to this. Also, batteries with a higher amp hour rating in practice can also often let the power tool deliver a slightly higher peak power due to the ability to deliver a higher current.

Even when using the same battery technology, voltage rating and amp hour rating, the interface of batteries for power tools are often not compatible across different manufacturers, and sometimes also not even within the same brand or product line. There are examples of aftermarket adapters being made so that the user can mix and match batteries between well-known brands, but these often do not fully implement the tools battery safety and monitoring systems and the use is done at the user's own risk.

=== Battery alliances ===
There are initiatives with the goal that the same battery can be used across products from several manufacturers, mostly those who offer special tools rather than general ones. Mainly two German companies have opened their 18V systems for others:

- In June 2018, nine companies presented a manufacturer-overlapping system for rechargeable batteries called "Cordless Alliance System" (CAS). It is based on Metabo's 18 Volt battery system.
- In 2020, Bosch initiated the "Power For All Alliance". Notably, the alliance consists of the brands Gardena, Gloria, Wagner and Rapid. However, the Power For All Alliance batteries will only be used on Bosch's consumer tools in the Bosch Home & Garden line and Bosch Home Appliances line.
- AMPShare – powered by Bosch Professional is the new name for the alliance using Bosch professional ("blue") tools with its own battery and charger system which is incompatible with the Power For All batteries. Aimed at most parts of the world except North America, it claims to be based on 80 million batteries sold since 2008. Over two dozen companies take part.

== Types ==
Power tools include:

- Air compressor
- Alligator shear
- Angle grinder
- Bandsaw
- Belt sander
- Biscuit joiner
- Ceramic tile cutter
- Chainsaw
- Circular saw
- Concrete mixer
- Concrete saw
- Cold saw
- Crusher
- Diamond blade
- Diamond tool
- Die grinder
- Disc cutter
- Disc sander
- Drill
- Floor sander
- Grinding machine
- Heat gun
- Hedge trimmer
- Impact driver
- Impact wrench
- Jackhammer
- Jointer
- Jigsaw
- Knitting machine
- Lathe
- Lawn mower
- Leaf blower
- Miter saw
- Multi-tool
- Nail gun (electric and battery as well as powder actuated)
- Needlegun scaler
- Pneumatic torque wrench
- Powder-actuated tools
- Power wrench
- Pressure washer
- Radial arm saw
- Random orbital sander
- Reciprocating saw
- Rotary saw
- Rotary tool
- Rotary tiller
- Sabre saw
- Sander
- Scroll saw
- Snow blower
- Steel cut off saw
- String trimmer
- Table saw
- Thickness planer
- Wall chaser
- Wood router

== Manufacturers ==
=== Power tool manufacturers with a full range program ===
Brand	Owner	Headquarters
AEG Electric Tools	Techtronic Industries (TTI) by acquiring the AEG Electric Tools brand in 2004. Brand under license from Electrolux.	China
Black & Decker	Stanley Black & Decker, Inc.	United States
DeWalt	Stanley Black & Decker, Inc.	United States
Craftsman	Stanley Black & Decker, Inc.	United States
Bosch	Robert Bosch GmbH	Germany
Hikoki	Formerly Hitachi Group. today owned by Kohlberg Kravis Roberts & Co.	Japan United States
Hilti	Hilti AG	Liechtenstein
Makita	Makita Corporation	Japan
Mastercraft	Canadian Tire Corporation	Canada
Metabo	Metabowerke GmbH. today owned by Kohlberg Kravis Roberts & Co.	Germany United States
Milwaukee	Techtronic Industries (TTI) by acquiring Milwaukee Electric Tool Corporation in 2005	United States China
Ryobi Power Tools	Techtronic Industries (TTI) by acquiring Ryobi's North American power tools business in 2000. Brand under license from Ryobi Limited.	Japan China

=== Specialized companies ===
A number of companies, some of which are comparatively small and specialized, build niche solutions for industry and trade.

Brand	Owner	Headquarters	Usage / Program
Dolmar	Makita Corporation, Japan, by acquiring Dolmar GmbH 1991	Germany Japan	Forestry and garden tools
Dremel	Dremel now a brand of Bosch Power Tools	United States Germany	Fast-moving multifunctional tools
Duss	Friedrich Duss Maschinenfabrik GmbH & Co. KG	Germany	Drilling (hammer drills, chisel hammers, diamond drills)
Fein	Fein-Verwaltung GmbH of C. & E. Fein GmbH	Germany	Tool for cutting, drilling and grinding (metal construction)
Festool	TTS Tooltechnic Systems Holding AG (Wendlingen)	Germany	Sawing and sanding for wood construction (also compressed air)
Flex	Chervon Holdings Ltd, Owner of Flex-Elektrowerkzeuge GmbH (Deutschland, Steinheim an der Murr)	Germany China	Separating, grinding and screwing
Hazet	Hazet GmbH,	Germany	Impact screws (mainly pneumatic range)
Lösomat	Gedore GmbH, Remscheid (Gedore Torque Solutions), by acquiring Lösomat Schraubtechnik Neef GmbH, Vaihingen an der Enz	Germany	High-torque screwdriver tools
Mafell	Mafell AG	Germany	Sawing (wood)
Matjeschk	M-PT Matjeschk-PowerTools GmbH & Co. KG, Ralbitz-Rosenthal	Germany	Drilling and screwing
Perles	ATech d.o.o.	Slovenia	Drilling tools
Stihl	Stihl AG	Germany	Forestry and garden tools

=== Trading companies ===
With purchases from other manufacturers and OEM production

Brand	Owner	Headquarters	Program range
AEG Electric Tools	Techtronic Industries (TTI) by acquiring the AEG Electric Tools brand in 2004 and licensed the brand name from Electrolux, the AEG owner.	China	Full range
Einhell	Einhell Germany AG, Landau an der Isar	Germany	Full range
Parkside	Lidl Stiftung & Co. KG	Germany	Full range
Stahlwerk	Stahlwerk Schweissgeräte GmbH	Germany	
Worx	Positec Tool Corporation	China	Full range
Würth	Würth-Group	Germany	Full range

=== More brands and its manufacturer ===
The incomplete list lists the brand first, then its manufacturer or owner.

- Baier Power Tools, brand of Otto Baier GmbH, Germany
- Casals Power Tools from Spain, brand of Interskol Group, Russia
- Duss of Friedrich Duss Maschinenfabrik GmbH & Co. KG, Germany
- Narex, Czech Republic, today owned by TTS Tooltechnic Systems (Festool) and OEM for other manufacturer
- Panasonic, Japan
- REMS, Germany
- Skil, brand of Chervon, China
- Trotec, brand of Trodat GmbH, Austria
- Trumpf, Germany

== See also ==
- Antique tools
- Cutting tools
- Cutting tool material
- Garden tools
- Hand arm vibrations
- NIOSH Power Tools Database
- Occupational dust exposure
