= Powder-actuated tool =

Type of nail gun

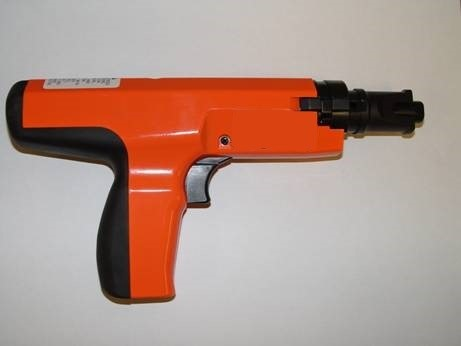
Ramset powder-actuated tool

A powder-actuated tool (PAT, often generically called a Hilti gun or a Ramset gun after their manufacturing companies) is a type of nail gun used in construction and manufacturing to join materials to hard substrates such as steel and concrete. Known as direct fastening or explosive fastening, this technology is powered by a controlled explosion of a small chemical propellant charge, similar to the process that discharges a firearm.

== Features ==
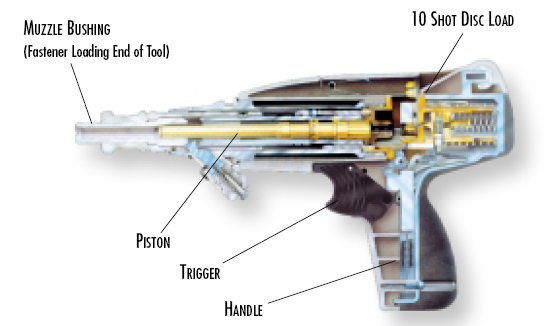
Low-velocity powder-actuated tool cross section

Powder-actuated tools are often used because of their speed of operation, compared to other processes such as drilling and then installing a threaded fastener. They can more easily be used in narrow or awkward locations, such as installing steel suspension clips into an overhead concrete ceiling.

Powder-actuated tools are powered by small explosive cartridges, which are triggered when a firing pin strikes a primer, a sensitive explosive charge in the base of the cartridge. The primer ignites the main charge of powder, which burns rapidly. The hot gases released by the burning of the propellant rapidly build pressure within the cartridge, which pushes either directly on the head of the fastener, or on a piston, accelerating the fastener out of the muzzle.

Powder-actuated tools come in high-velocity and low-velocity types. In high-velocity tools, the propellant charge acts directly on the fastener in a process similar to a firearm. Low-velocity tools introduce a piston into the chamber. The propellant acts on the piston, which then drives the fastener into the substrate. The piston is analogous to the bolt of a captive bolt pistol.

A tool is considered low velocity if the average test velocity of the fastener is not in excess of 300 ft/s (91 m/s) with no single test having a velocity of over 108 m/s (350 ft/s). A high velocity tool propels or discharges a stud, pin, or fastener in excess of 300 ft/s (91 m/s).

High-velocity tools made or sold in the United States must comply under certain circumstances; with many being used in the shipbuilding and steel industries.

Powder-actuated fasteners are made of special heat-treated steel; common nails are unsafe for this application. There are many specialized fasteners designed for specific applications in the construction and manufacturing industries.

== History ==
Powder-actuated technology was developed for commercial use during the Second World War, when high-velocity fastening systems were used to temporarily repair damage to ships. In the case of hull breaches, these tools fastened steel plates over damaged areas. These tools were developed by Mine Safety Appliances, for the United States Navy. Powder-actuated tools were investigated and used prior to this development; they were used in anti-submarine warfare during the First World War and were the subject of a 1921 United States patent (US Patent No. 1365869). During WWII the Special Operations Executive (SOE) developed a “Nail Gun” used for attaching explosive charges to ship’s hulls. Two versions of the projectile, one for steel hulls and another for wooden hulls were developed. Apparently the two piece nail was for steel hulls and the single piece nail was for wooden hulls. The propulsive charge was in a chamber just ahead of the copper sealing cap on the rear of the nail.

== Types ==
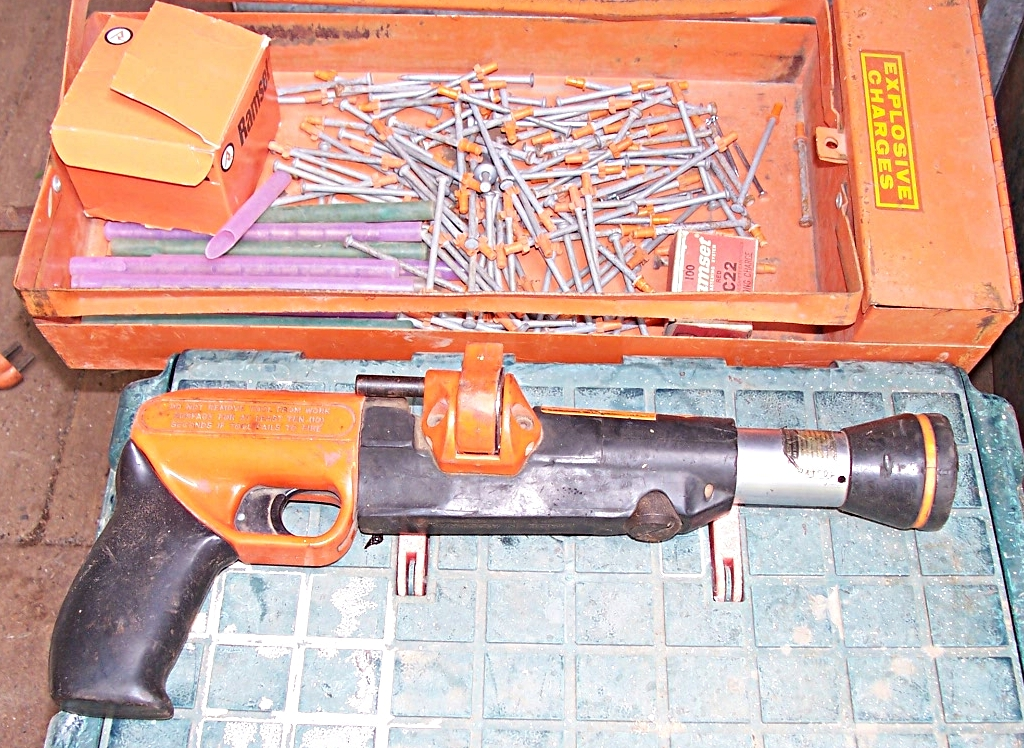
A Ramset powder actuated fastener tool and supplies. The colored straws in the tray contain cartridges that are loaded singly into the tool. Also visible are 75 mm hardened steel nails with 8 mm heads.

Powder actuated tools can be variously classified:

- Direct acting (the charge acts directly on the head of the nail or high velocity), or indirect (using an intermediate piston or low velocity)
- Single-shot, or magazine-fed
- Automatic or manual piston cycling
- Automatic or manual feed of the charges

== Energy sources ==
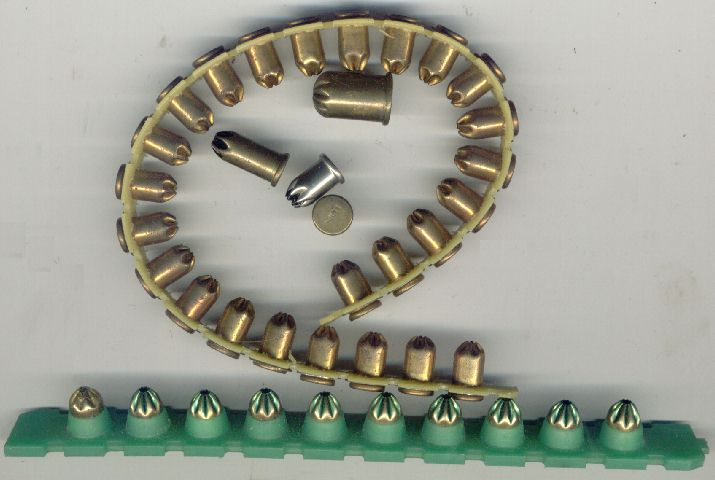
Strip-fed cartridges for a nail gun

Powder-actuated tools are powered by specially designed blank firearm cartridges, also informally called "loads", "boosters", "rounds", or "charges".

In many cases, the charges are ordinary firearm cartridges with modified casings, and the bullets omitted. The .22 Short, developed by Smith & Wesson, is common. These charges may be hand-fed (single-shot), or manufactured and distributed on a plastic carrier strip.

=== Color coding ===
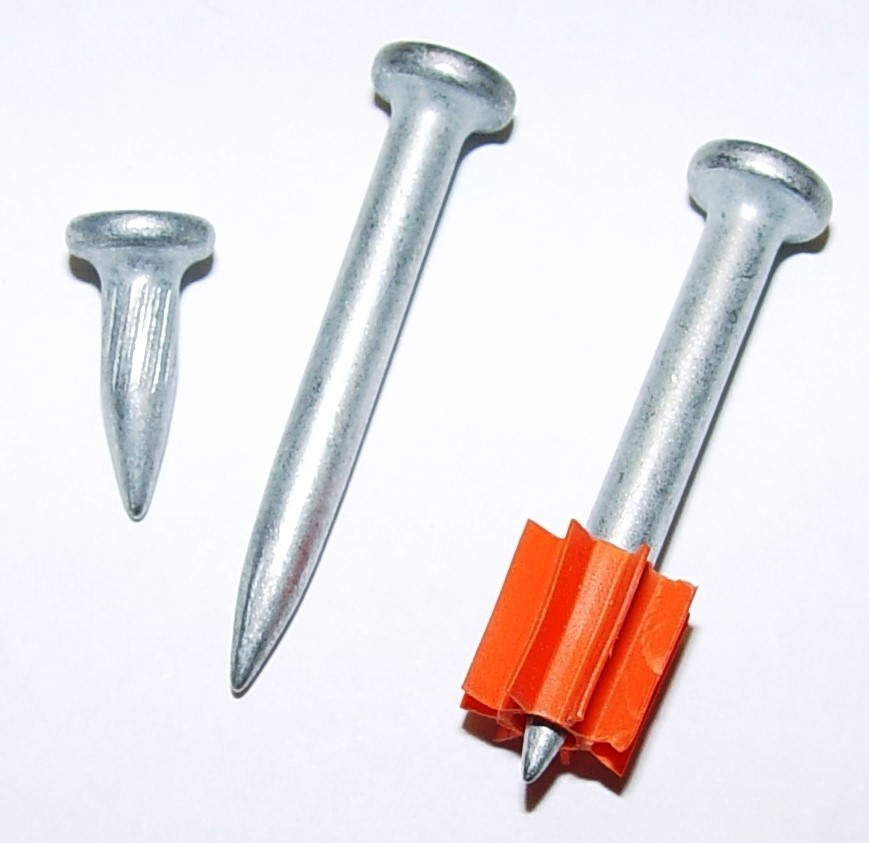
Powder-Actuated Drive Pins, one fitted with an orange-colored sabot

Yellow sabot near the tip of the round

In brass-colored casings:
Color coding	Velocity
Gray	315 ft/s (96 m/s)
Brown	385 ft/s (117 m/s)
Green	490 ft/s (150 m/s)
Yellow	575 ft/s (175 m/s)
Red	675 ft/s (206 m/s)
Purple	755 ft/s (230 m/s)

In nickel (silver-colored) casings:
Color coding	Velocity
Gray	845 ft/s (258 m/s)
Brown	935 ft/s (285 m/s)
Green	1,025 ft/s (312 m/s)
Yellow	1,115 ft/s (340 m/s)
Red	1,205 ft/s (367 m/s)
Purple	1,295 ft/s (395 m/s)

The three single-shot strengths or colors typically sold to the general public are brown, green, and yellow in brass-colored casings.

Not all powder-actuated tools are rated for high-capacity charges—the strongest charge (nickel-purple at 1,295 ft/s (395 m/s)), for example, is dangerous in a tool not rated for the high pressures it generates. The table above is for a 350-grain (23 g) slug from a test device.

== Safety and regulation ==
As with their air-actuated cousins, powder-actuated guns have a muzzle safety interlock. If the muzzle is not pressed against a surface with sufficient force, the firing pin is blocked and cannot reach the load to fire it. This helps ensure that the gun does not discharge in an unsafe manner, causing the nail to become an unrestrained projectile.

Due to their potential for causing personal injury, OSHA regulations in the US require certification specific to the tool being used before any person is permitted to rent or use powder-actuated equipment. Most manufacturers of powder-actuated nail guns offer training and certification, some with no further charge online testing. In addition, special instruction is necessary if the prospective user is unable to distinguish colors used in the color code system that identifies proper power levels. Most certifications are accepted for life; however, in California they must be renewed every three years.

== See also ==
- Pneumatic tool
- Power tool
