= Festool =

German power tool manufacturer

Festool GmbH
- Type: GmbH
- Industry: Manufacturing
- Founded: 1925; 101 years ago
- Headquarters: Wendlingen, Germany
- Products: Power tools and accessories
- Revenue: €340M
- Number of employees: 3,300
- Parent: TTS Tooltechnic Systems
- Website: www.festool.com

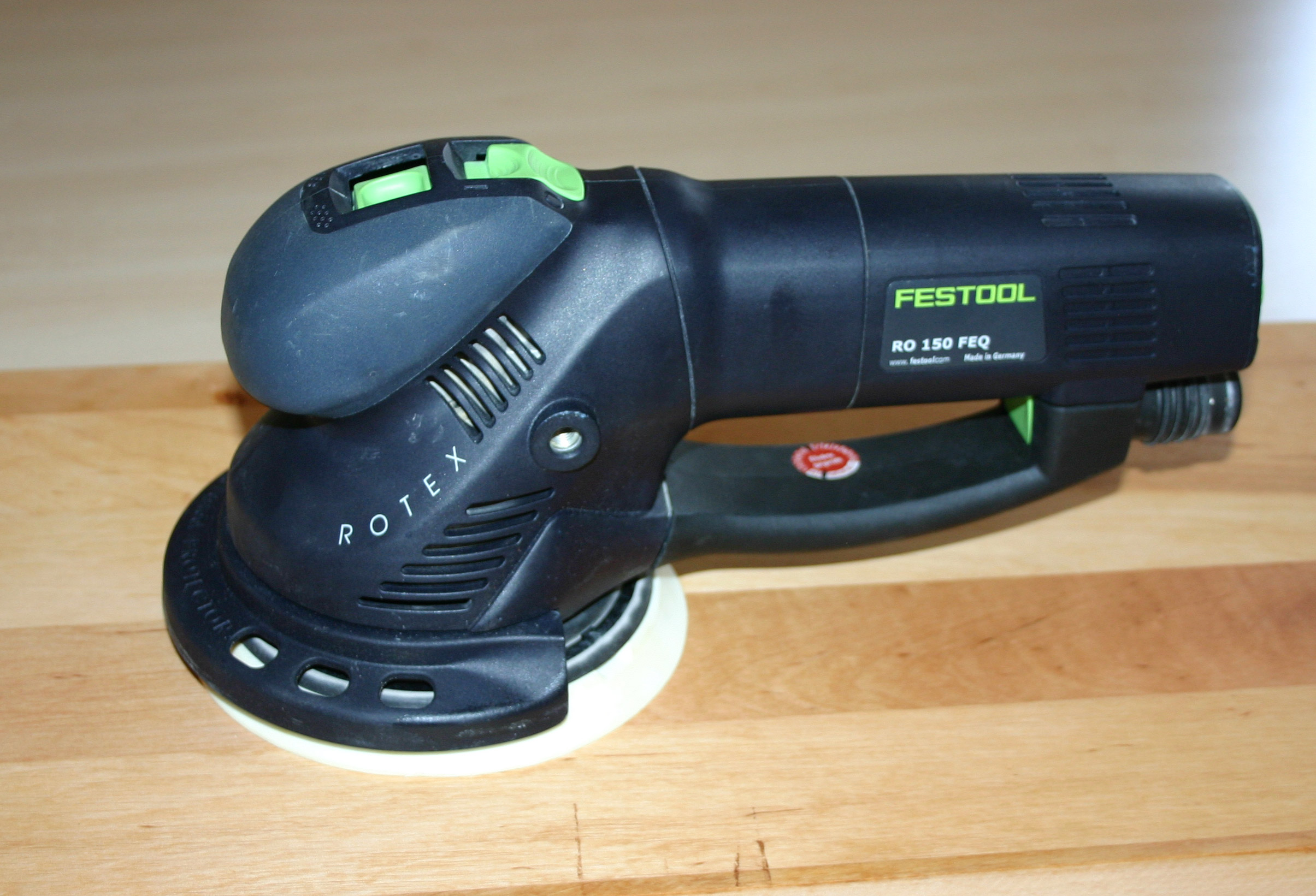
Festool random orbital sander

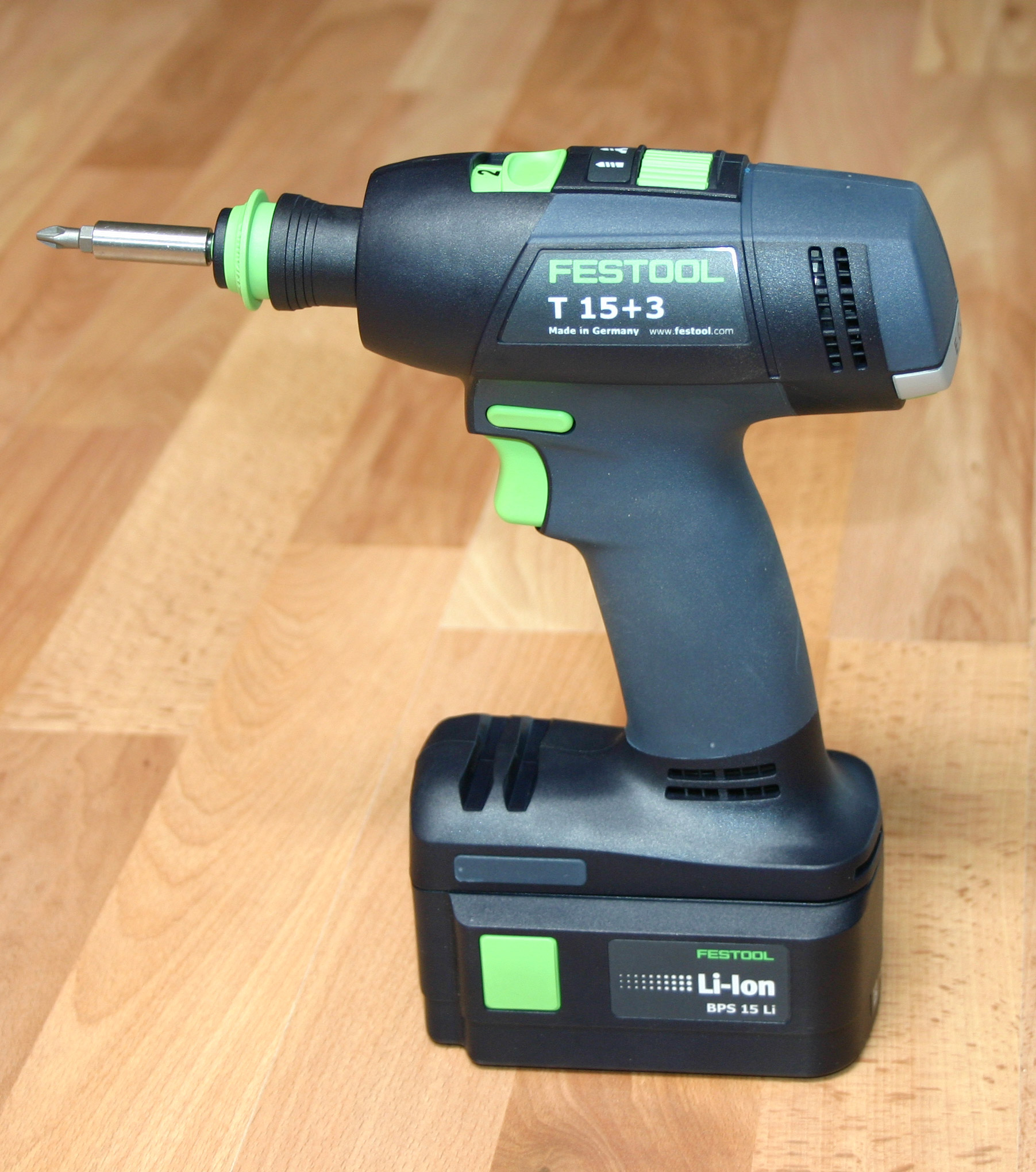
Festool cordless drill

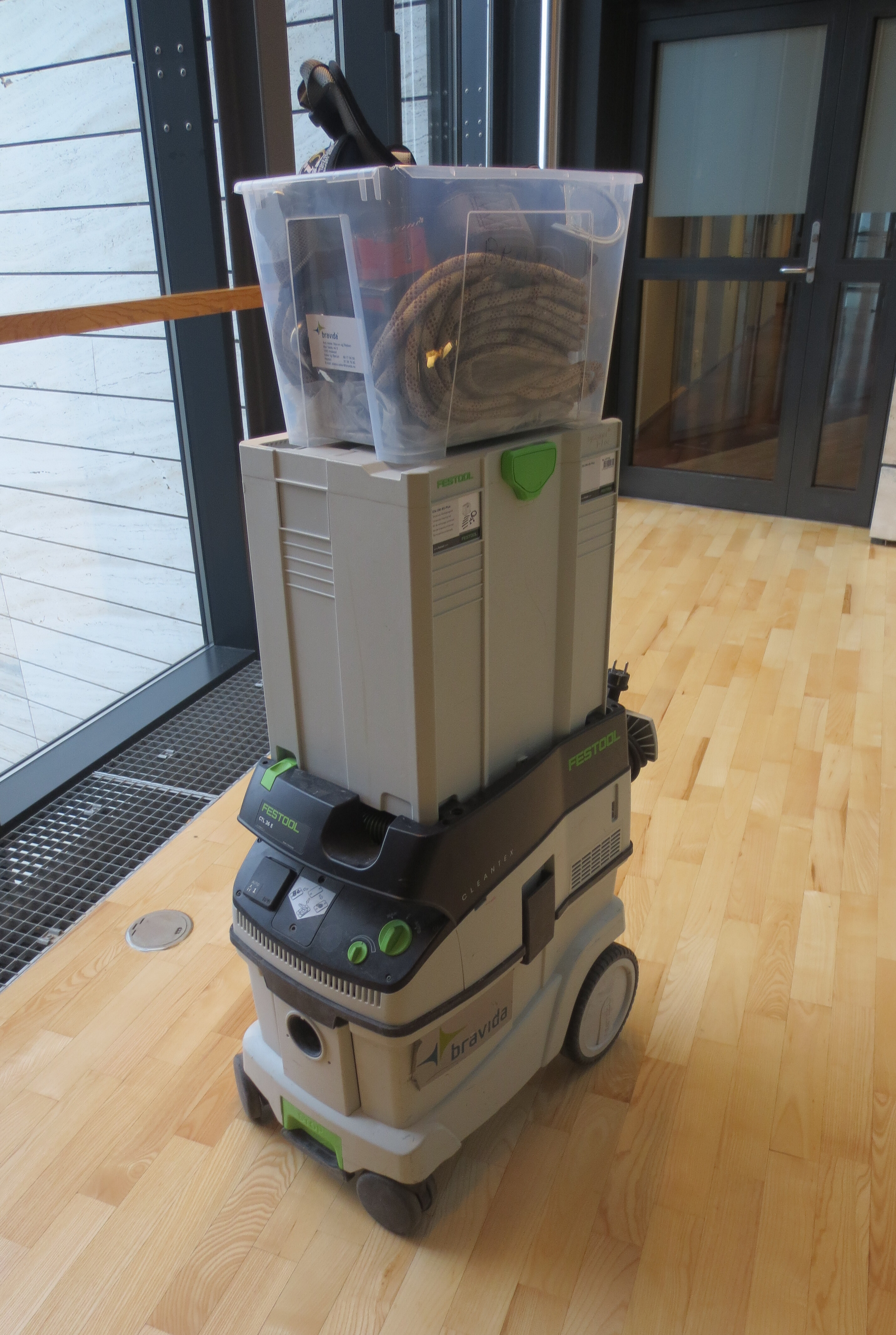
Festool dust extractor with attached systainer

Festool is a brand of high-end power tools from Germany. Festool Group GmbH & Co. KG is based in Wendlingen and is a subsidiary of the TTS Tooltechnic Systems holding company. It is known for its system-based approach to power tools and its focus on dust extraction.

The company was founded by Gottlieb Stoll and Albert Fezer in 1925 under the name Fezer & Stoll. The company manufactured the world's first portable chainsaw in 1927. The company's name was shortened to Festo in 1933. Festo founded Festo Tooltechnic in 1992, and the power tool division was spun off into an independent company, Festool, in 2000. The company remains privately owned by the family of co-founder Gottlieb Stoll.

In 2005, the company introduced a loose mortise and tenon joining tool called the Domino joiner.

As of October 2017, Festool operates subsidiaries in 26 countries including the United Kingdom, the United States, Canada, France, the Netherlands, and Russia. In late 2017, it set up its first Asian subsidiary in South Korea. Festool products are primarily manufactured in Neidlingen (Germany), Illertissen (Germany), and Česká Lípa (Czech Republic). In July 2017, Festool opened its first North American production line at its Lebanon, Indiana, facility, where it produces mainly guide rails for its track-saw system.

Festool's system-based power tool design includes the use of modular plastic containers, called "systainers", that are produced by its sister company TANOS, and multi-function parts such as guide rails for stationary work and power tools. It also produces a workbench system involving Multifunction tables (MFTs).
