= Einhell =

German electrical tool manufacturer

Einhell Germany AG
- Company type: Aktiengesellschaft
- Industry: Tools
- Founded: 1964; 62 years ago Landau an der Isar, West Germany
- Founder: Hans Einhell; Josef Thannhuber
- Headquarters: Landau an der Isar, Germany
- Area served: Worldwide
- Key people: Andreas Kroiss; Jan Teichert; Markus Thannhuber
- Products: Power tools, garden equipment
- Brands: Ozito(in Australia)
- Revenue: ▲€486 million (2016)
- Number of employees: 1400
- Subsidiaries: iSC GmbH kwb Germany GmbH
- Website: einhell.com

Einhell Germany AG is a German manufacturer of power tools and electrical garden equipment in Landau an der Isar, Germany.

== History ==
It was founded on June 2, 1964 by Josef Thannhuber as Hans Einhell GmbH. Hans Einhell was the uncle of Josef Thannhuber.

In the late 1960s it opened a factory in Spain. The company floated on the stock market in 1987. It is a Prime Standard traded company on Xetra (EING_p.DE).

== Structure ==
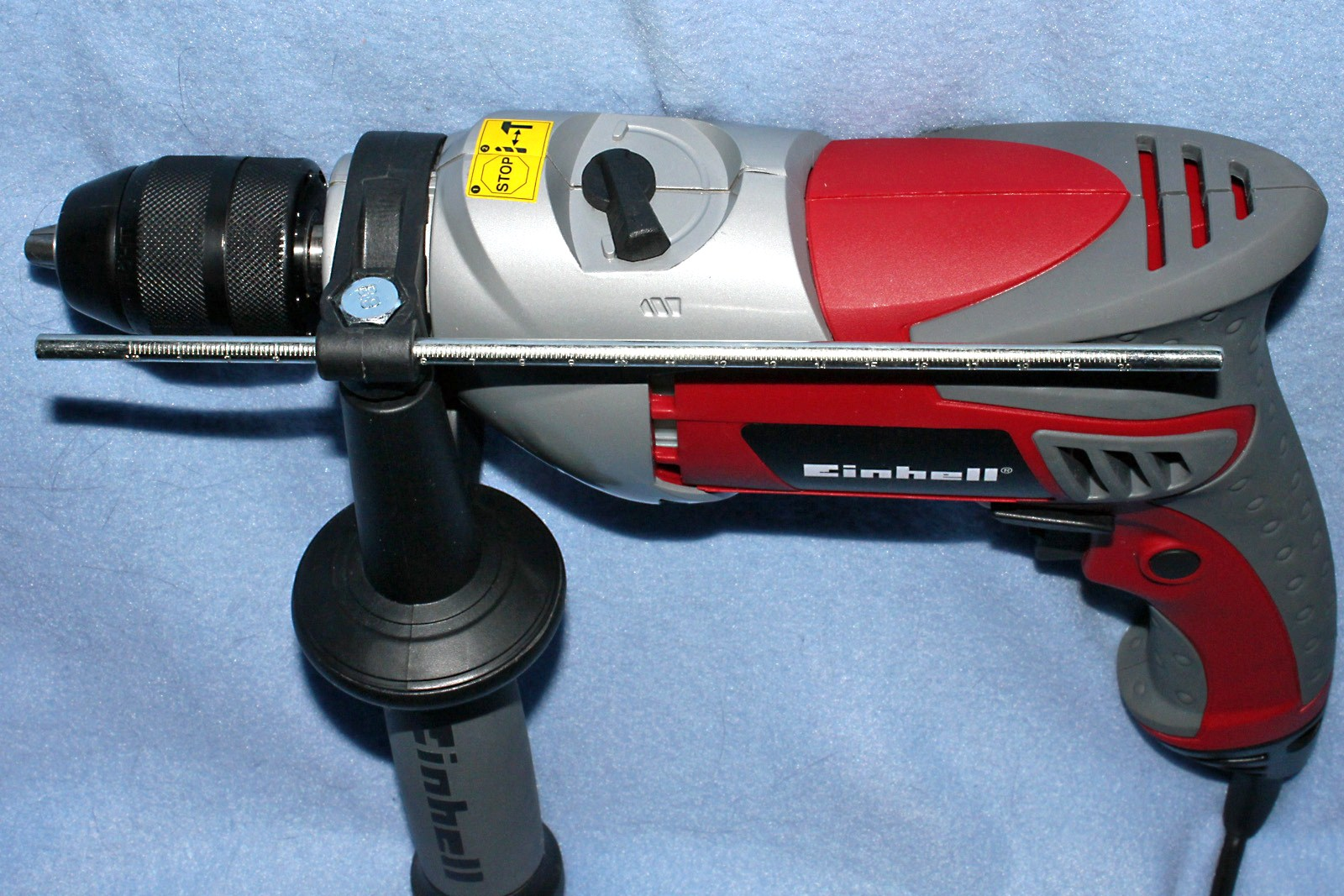
Einhell power drill

It has around 1,400 employees. In 2016 it turned over €486 million. Andreas Kroiss has been their Chief Executive since January 2003.

In 2013, Einhell took over Ozito, an Australian company supplying Bunnings DIY products for their stores all over Australia. Ozito produces construction tools under Full Boar and low-end power tools under XU1.

For a time, they distributed the Ozito range in the UK through Homebase and then when it became Bunnings, from 2016 to 2018.

Einhell UK is situated in Birkenhead in the Wirral, on the Champions Business Park. They only supply complete products, spares have to be ordered through Einhell Germany.

== Products ==
some of the Ozito range available at Bunnings Western Australia in July 2025

- Angle grinders
- Chainsaws
- Grinding machines
- Hammer drills
- Heat guns
- Jigsaws
- Lawn mowers
- Power drills
- Sanders
- Scroll saws
- String trimmers
- Table saws
- Vacuum cleaners
