= Mafell =

German power tool manufacturer

Mafell AG
- Type: AG
- Industry: Power tools
- Founded: 1899; 127 years ago
- Headquarters: Oberndorf-Lindenhof, Germany
- Key people: Matthias Krauss, Vorstandsvorsitzender; Rigo Züfle, Vorstand; Michael Ungethüm, Aufsichtsratsvorsitzender
- Number of employees: 280
- Website: www.mafell.de

Mafell AG (Maschinenfabrik Fellbach AktienGesellschaft) is a manufacturer of high-end woodworking power tools specialized for carpentry, founded in 1899. They are the inventor of the first portable electric carpentry power tool, a chain mortiser invented in 1926. The company is located in Oberndorf am Neckar, Germany.

== Awards ==
In the year 2002 Mafell was awarded the Rudolf-Eberle-Award for its panel saw system PSS 3100 and in 2003 the Eumacop innovation award for its Flexistem KSP 40. Furthermore, in the years 2007, 2009 and 2014 Mafell was listed as one of the 100 most innovative companies in the world.
