= Gray Tools =

Gray Tools Canada Inc.
- Type: Private
- Industry: Manufacturing
- Founded: Toronto, Ontario, Canada (September 12, 1912; 114 years ago)
- Founder: Alex Gray
- Headquarters: Brampton, Ontario, Canada
- Number of locations: 2
- Key people: Gary Nuttall; (President & CEO)
- Products: Professional hand tools; Tool storage; Custom tools
- Number of employees: 100 (2011)
- Divisions: Dynamic Tools
- Website: www.graytools.com

Gray Tools is a Canadian professional tool company based in Brampton, Ontario. Founded in 1912 by Alex Gray (1883-1969), Gray Tools is Canada's largest professional tool manufacturing company, with 4000 industrial products available.

== History ==
Gray Tools Canada was founded in 1912 by Alex Gray as a machinery equipment supplier. As the automobile industry was starting up, Gray began making automobile manufacturing tools and tool kits specific to the automobile companies in nearby Detroit.

In May 2012, President and owner Alex Gray III sold the company to Garry Nuttall and Frank Dominguez. Alex Gray III remains with the company as chairman.

As of 2013, the company employed 60 people at its head office in Brampton, Ontario, where all manufacturing is done. Company warehouses are located in Brampton and Edmonton, Alberta.

Gray Tools celebrated its 100th birthday by making a large donation of tools and equipment to local schools and by initiating the Gray Tools Canada Highest Standard Achievement Award, presented to a student with exceptional success in vocational education.

== Products ==
The main focus at Gray tools is the professional hand tool line. Tool storage and organization is a subsidiary product line. A cheaper line of foreign-made tools sold as Dynamic are made to compete with the middle range tool marketplace.
