= Random orbital sander =

Power tool

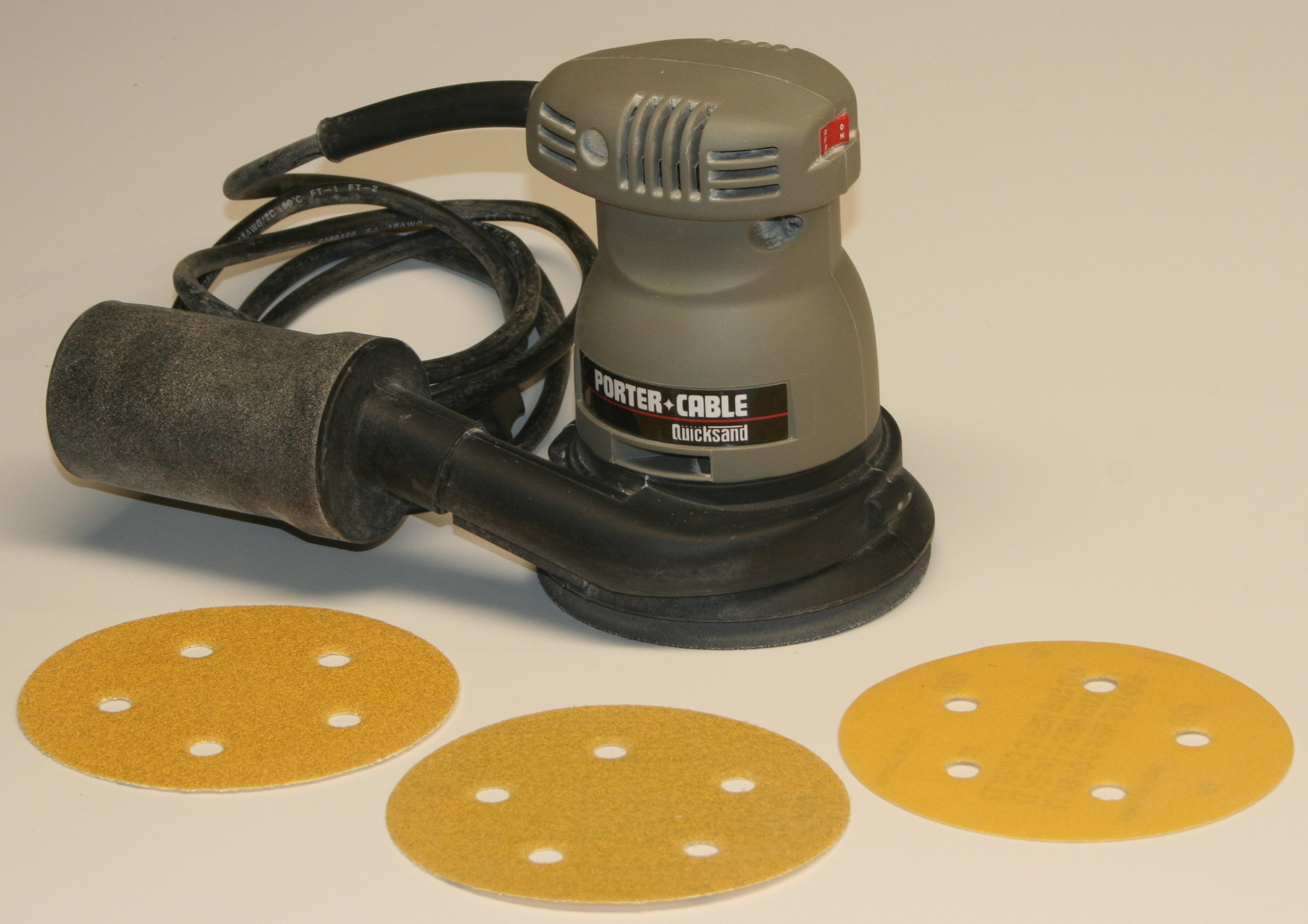
A random orbit sander, with disks of various grit sizes

A random orbital sander (also known as a palm sander) is a hand-held power tool which sands in a random-orbit action—that is, in constant irregular overlapping circles. This technology was first commercially utilized in 1968 by Rupes Tools. Random orbital sanders combine the speed and aggressiveness with the ability to produce a finer finish than that available from a standard, slow speed orbital finishing sander. Random orbital sanders generally come in three different types: electric powered, air powered, and orbital floor sanders. The electric and air powered orbital sanders are handheld, while the floor orbital sanders are large machines that roll.

The random orbit sanding pattern is produced by simultaneously spinning the sanding disk and moving it in small ellipses. This ensures that no single part of the abrasive material travels the same path twice during the same rotation. Because of this random sanding action, the tool does not leave swirl marks, and is less sensitive to the direction of the wood grain. This makes it useful when sanding two pieces of wood that will be fastened at right angles. Random-orbit sanders use sandpaper disks, and many include integrated dust collectors. Disks are attached using either pressure-sensitive adhesives or a hook and loop system. On models equipped with a dust collection feature, a vacuum sucks discharged dust through holes in the paper and pad, feeding it to a bag, shop vac, or canister.
