= Flex-Elektrowerkzeuge =

German power tool manufacturer

FLEX-Elektrowerkzeuge GmbH
- Type: GmbH
- Founded: 1922
- Headquarters: Steinheim an der Murr, Germany
- Key people: Ralf Häfele (CEO)
- Products: Professional power tools
- Number of employees: 320
- Website: flex-tools.com

FLEX-Elektrowerkzeuge GmbH is a German producer of power tools with headquarters in Steinheim. Founded in 1922, after producing its first MS6 angle grinder, FLEX became the first supplier of the tool in 1935. In 1954, FLEX invented and began supply of the first flexible shaft angle grinder.

The brand name 'Flex' is listed in the German dictionary Duden as a brand name and is occasionally used colloquially for angle grinders, the derived verb flexen is used for cut-off grinding.

The company has been owned by the Chinese Chervon Holdings Ltd. since 2013.

== History ==
=== Foundation and Development ===
In 1922, Hermann Ackermann and Hermann Schmitt founded the company Ackermann & Schmitt in Stuttgart-Bad Cannstatt. Their initial product was the MS6 hand grinder, which featured an electric motor with an attached flexible shaft. By the late 1920s, the company replaced the flexible shaft with an angular gearbox.

In 1935, Ackermann & Schmitt introduced the first low-speed angle grinder, followed by the launch of the first high-speed grinder in 1954.

The outbreak of the Second World War abruptly disrupted Ackermann & Schmitt's operations. The company was compelled to shift its manufacturing focus to aircraft production. In 1941, the company faced the death of one of its founders, Hermann Schmitt, when he was killed in action in Russia.

After the war, although much of the factory infrastructure remained intact, French dismantling teams removed most of the manufacturing machines. Hermann Ackermann worked to rebuild the company, resuming production with the manufacture of scissors, hand grinders, and a joint arm grinder. In 1954, Ackermann & Schmitt introduced the first high-speed angle grinder, the "DL 9".

=== Transition to Flex-Elektrowerkzeuge GmbH ===
In 1996, Ackermann & Schmitt rebranded as Flex-Elektrowerkzeuge GmbH. The company collaborated with Porter-Cable until 2004, when it was sold by Pentair to Stanley Black & Decker. Following this acquisition, Black & Decker took ownership of Flex-Elektrowerkzeuge GmbH.

Between 2005 and 2013, Flex was owned by various financial investors. In 2013, all shares in Flex-Elektrowerkzeuge GmbH were acquired by the Chinese company Chervon Holdings Ltd.

In North America, FLEX sell mainly metalworking (grinders and polishers) and masonry power tools, but in Europe it also makes and sells woodworking tools.

In 2019, Flex had 250 employees and sales of EUR 81.59 million, with an export ratio of 63.3%. In 2020, the company was reported to have retained 250 staff members. In 2021, FLEX became the shirt sponsor for Los Angeles FC.

As of May 2024, Flex was listed in the lexicon of the world market leaders, in the 1039th ranking.

== Products ==
Flex's product range is designed to cover four key application areas: restoration and renovation, metalworking, automotive paint processing, and natural stone processing.

=== Product History ===
- 1922: The first machine to be produced in series by Ackermann & Schmitt was the specially developed manual grinding machine, the MS 6. What set this machine apart was its innovative design, where the electric motor powered a flexible shaft, allowing for greater versatility and precision in grinding tasks.
- 1935: The company's first low-speed angle grinder is released.
- 1954: Introduction of the world's first high-speed angle grinder, the DL 9.
- 1989: Launch of the first satin finishing machine.
- 1997: Release of the Flex Giraffe ("GE 5 R"), a long-neck sander designed for ceiling and wall processing.
- 2007: Introduction of the Flex wall slitter, a tool designed for pulling or pushing cuts depending on whether the wall groove is intended to be vertical or horizontal.
- 2021: Release of Flex 24V Power Tools.
- 2023: Release of the Giraffe-Mobile GM 270.

Since the 2010s, the company has placed significant emphasis on developing cordless tools.

Flex offers tools powered by 10.8-volt and 18-volt batteries, featuring advanced brushless motors, and also 20V and 24V power sources.

== Company Structure ==
=== Headquarters and Employment ===
Flex is headquartered in Steinheim an der Murr, Germany. As of 2019, the company employed 250 people and generated a turnover of EUR 81.59 million, with 63.3% of sales attributed to exports.

=== Recent Developments ===
In 2020, the renovation of the administration building in Steinheim an der Murr was completed. In 2021, Flex introduced a revised brand design and a new slogan, "this is proformance," replacing the previous slogan, "The original." The term "proformance" is a portmanteau of "Profi" (professional) and "performance."

=== Subsidiaries and Corporate Structure ===
As of 2021, Flex operates five subsidiaries or sister companies:

- Flex Powertools BVBA in Belgium
- Flex Elektronaradi s.r.o. in the Czech Republic
- Flex Italia S.r.l. in Italy
- Flex Power Tools B.V. in the Netherlands
- FEMA S.A. in France

Until early 2021, Chervon North America Inc. was part of the Flex group. Following a restructuring of Chervon Holding Ltd., it now operates as an independent company, though it continues to use the Flex brand name, featuring a black and green design.

== Awards ==
Flex and its products have been recognized with several awards over the years:

- 2014:
  - Red Dot Design Award: Awarded for the Giraffe GE 5.
  - PLUS X Award: Received in the "Best Product of the Year" category for the Giraffe GE 5.
- 2016:
  - Industry Award 2016: Recognized in the "BEST OF" category for the TRINOXFLEX.
- 2018:
  - Red Dot Design Award: Awarded for both the PE 150 18.0-EC cordless polisher and the XFE 15 150 18.0-EC cordless eccentric polisher.
- 2024
  - Awarded four stars in Germany's most innovative companies 2024 list, from business magazine Capital and online platform, Statista.
