= Metabo =

German power tool manufacturer

Metabowerke GmbH
- Company type: GmbH
- Industry: Professional power tools
- Founded: 1924
- Headquarters: Nürtingen, Baden-Württemberg
- Key people: Horst W. Garbrecht (CEO) Eric Oellerer (CFO)
- Revenue: 348 million euro (2013)
- Number of employees: 1,800 (2014)
- Parent: KKR
- Website: www.metabo.com

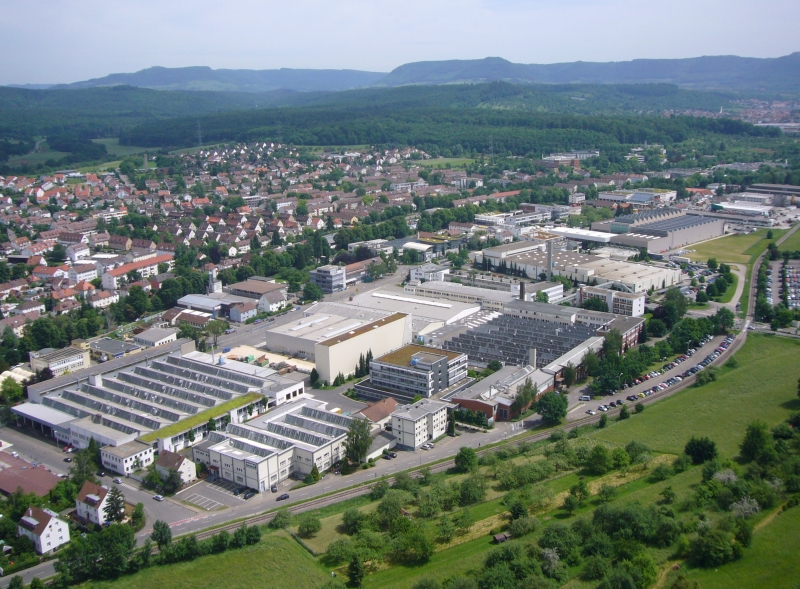
Metabo headquarters in Nürtingen

Metabowerke GmbH is a manufacturer of power tools for professional users headquartered in Nürtingen, Germany. The company was founded in the 1920s and got its name from a hand drill, the so-called "Metallbohrdreher". Today, Metabo offers a wide range of power tools. The company is owned by the American investment firm Kohlberg Kravis Roberts & Co.

== History ==
In 1923, Albrecht Schnizler built his first hand drill in his parents' bakery in Nürtingen. 50,000 copies of this drill were sold under the designation No. 18 and one year later the Schnizler GmbH was founded. Co-founder Julius Closs was the owner of a brewery called Sonnenbrauerei in Nürtingen. The company moved into the rooms of this brewery located in Church Street. Walter Rauch became an associate in 1927 and managed the national and international distribution of the machines. In 1932, the company was renamed Metabowerke Closs, Rauch & Schnizler KG. The plant was spared serious damages during the war years, but in late autumn of 1945, a fire destroyed close to 75% of the manufacturing facilities. The reconstruction was completed in 1948.

The company's rapid growth made it necessary to move to a new headquarters. Therefore, in 1953, the construction of a new plant in Nürtingen's industrial zone Steinach was initiated. The relocation was completed in 1969 with a new administrative building.

In the course of restructuring measures, the Metabo group acquired Elektra Beckum in 1999, a company from Meppen in Northern Germany. Combined with the takeover of two other (woodworking) machine manufacturers, this briefly made Metabo the second largest producer of stationary woodworking machines in the world. However, in the next decade, they decided to focus mostly on producing smaller power tools. In 2004, Metabo restructured the production and a plant in Shanghai was established. The full integration of Elektra Beckum took place in 2006. In 2010, the disposal of the plant in Meppen marked the end of the restructuring process of the production plants.

March 1, 2016, Metabo was acquired by Hitachi Koki, part of Hitachi Group.

The Hitachi Group sold Hitachi Koki in March 2017 to HK Holdings Co., Ltd., an entity of the investment firm KKR.

== The company today ==
Metabo is a medium-sized company which focuses on the main target groups of metal craftsmen and industry along with building trade and renovation. Metabo works with 23 distribution companies and has over 100 importers.

Worldwide, Metabo has over 1,800 employees with a sales volume of 348 million euro reported in 2013.

== Products ==
Essential or significant products and innovations, according to their own statements, are:

- 1934 – Metabo electric rotary drill No. 750
- 1957 – Metabo Type 7608, world's first impact drill series
- 1966 – Angle grinder with S-automatic safety clutch
- 1969 – Impact drill with electronic speed regulation
- 1981 – 1000 W impact drill with constant speed
- 2000 – Angle grinder with Metabo Marathon motor
- 2002 – Compact cordless screwdriver Power Grip
- 2005 – Introduction of lithium-ion battery technology into cordless tool range
- 2010 – Full range of stainless steel processing tools
- 2011 – Cordless magnetic core drilling unit
- 2012 – Battery pack with 4.0 Ah and Ultra-M-Technology
- 2013 – Battery pack with 5.2 Ah, flat-head angle grinder
- 2014 – New generation of compact angle grinders from 900 - 1700 W
- 2015 – LiHD battery pack technology

The company owns over 500 active patents and utility models.

A large number of the machines received the red dot design award.

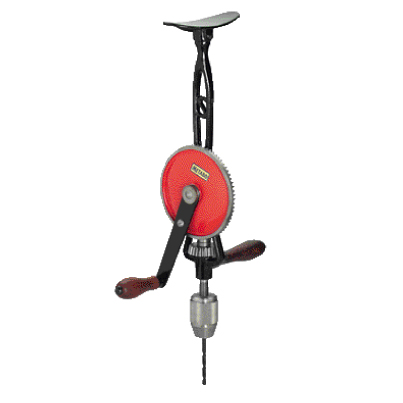
Metabo hand drill No. 18

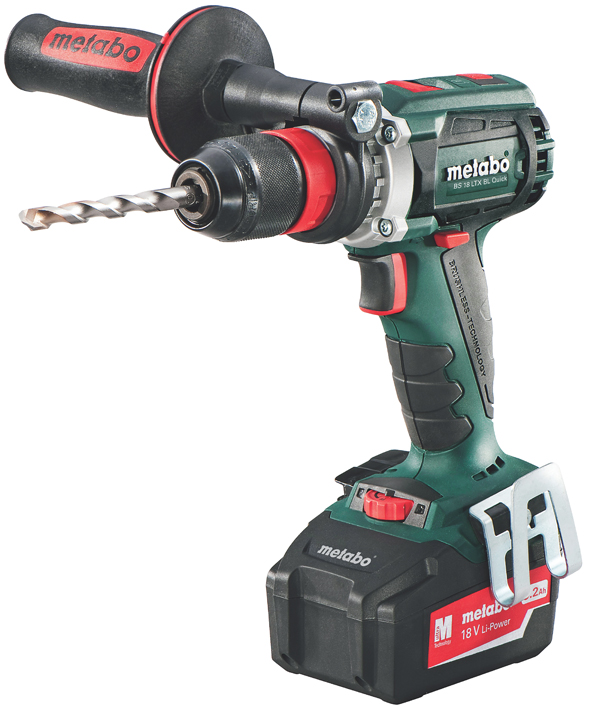
Brushless Metabo cordless drill/screwdriver BS 18 LTX BL Quick

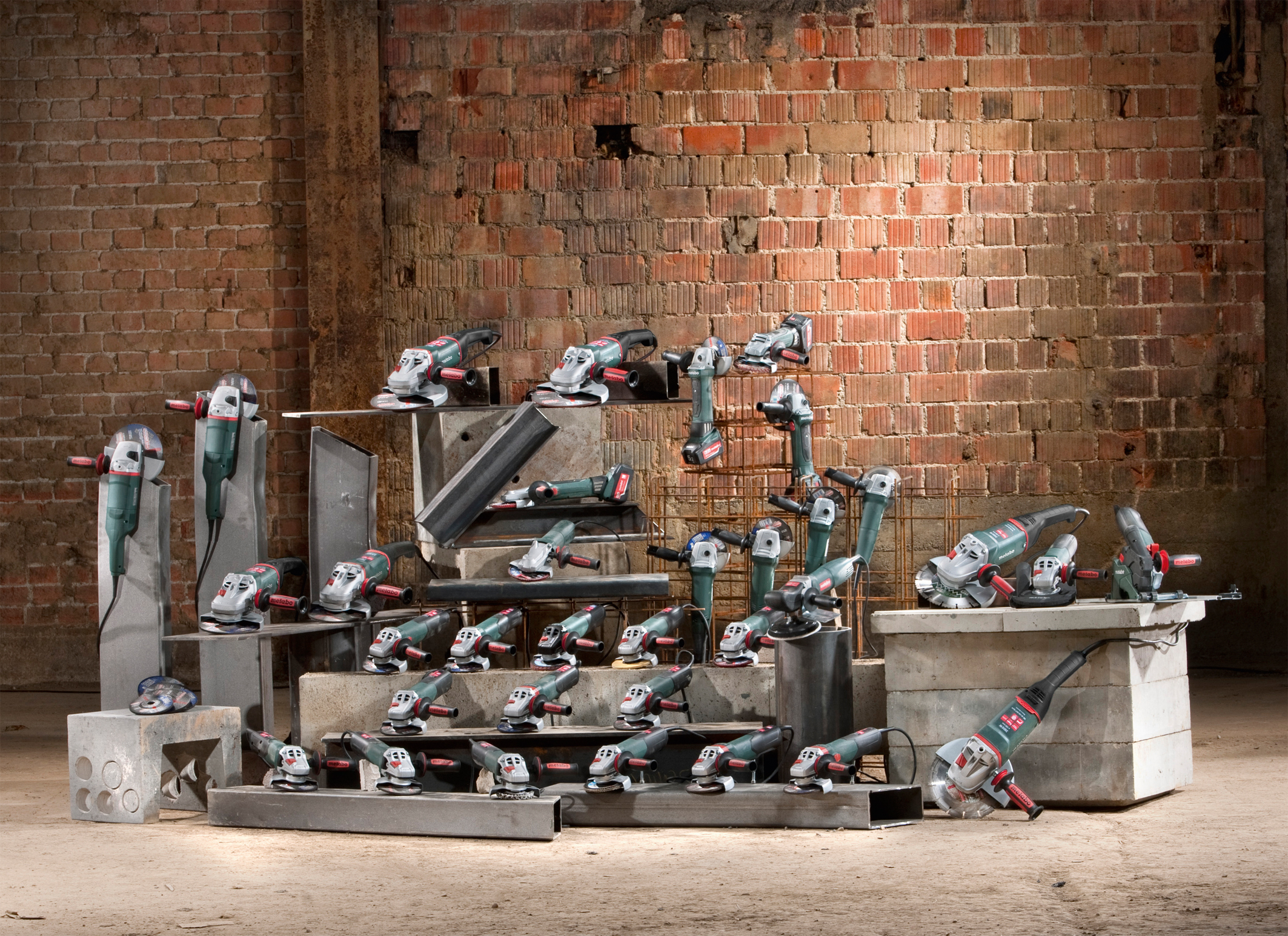
Metabo compact angle grinders from 900 - 1700 W

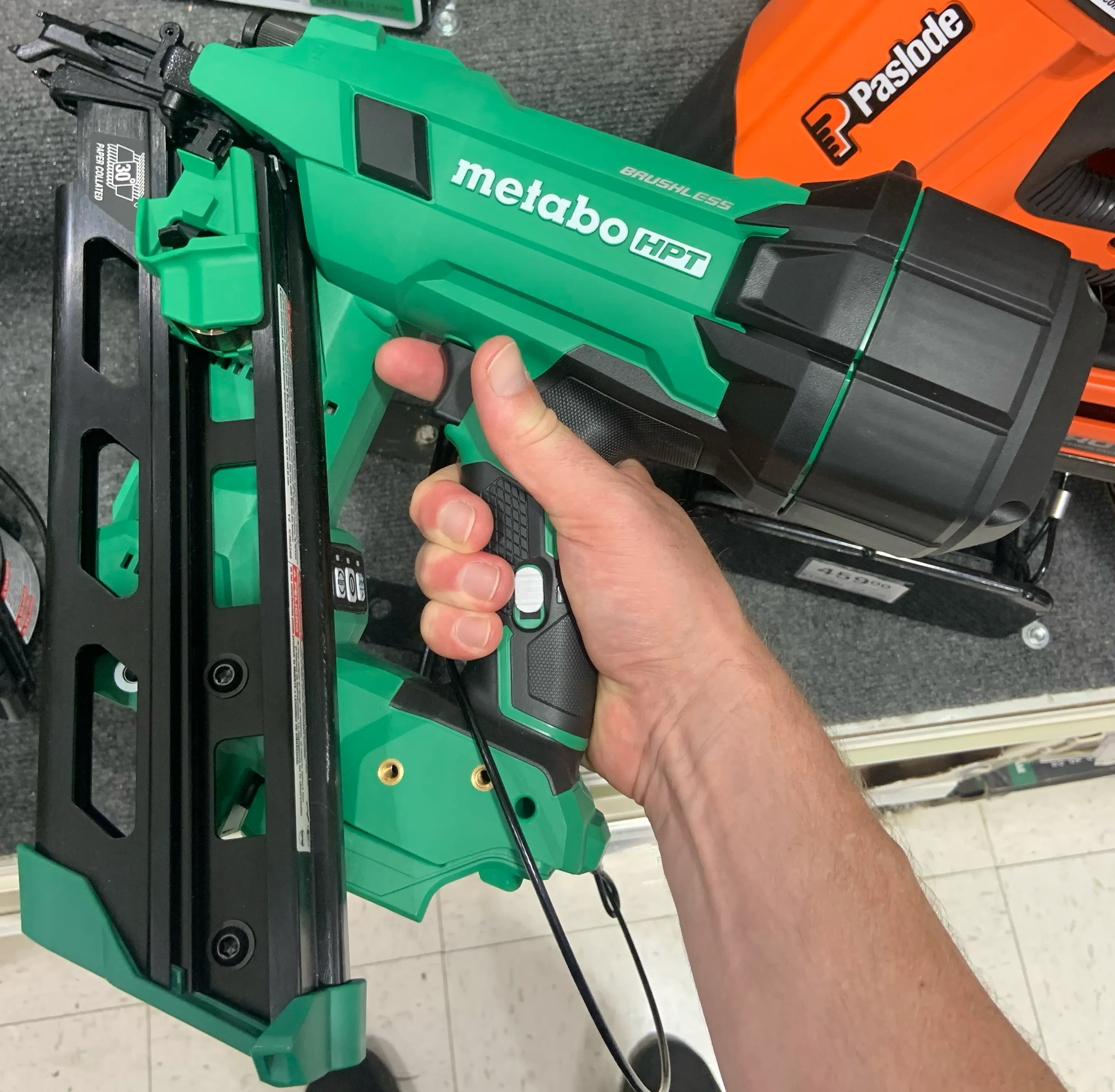
Metabo cordless nail gun
