= Landau an der Isar =

- Town
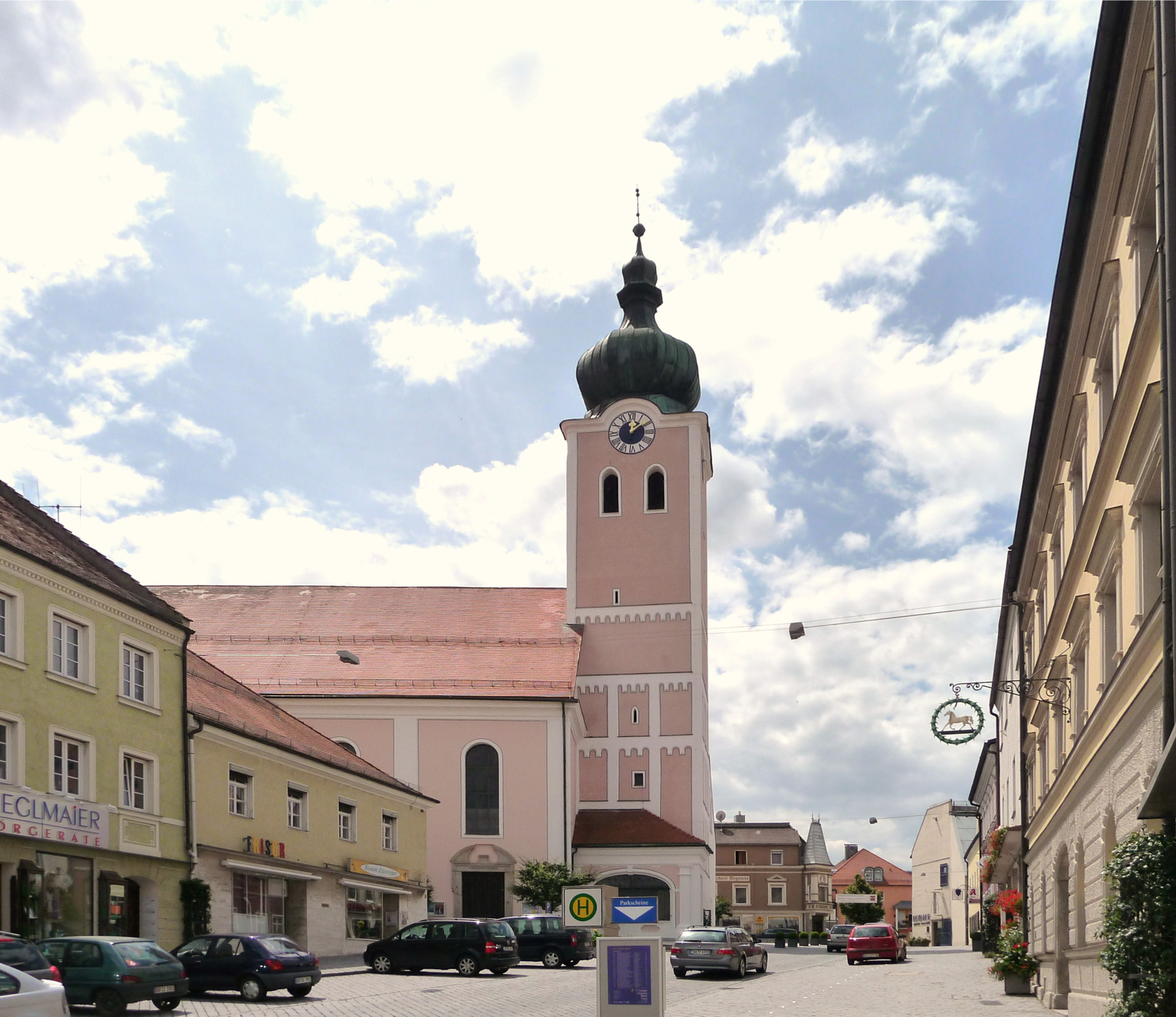
- Parish church

- Coat of arms

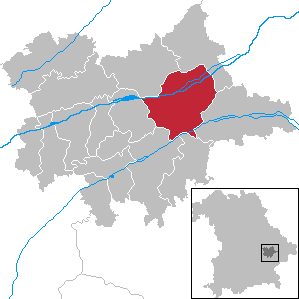
- Location of Landau an der Isar within Dingolfing-Landau district
- Interactive map of Landau an der Isar
- Location within Germany Location within Bavaria
- Coordinates: 48°40′N 12°40′E
- Country: Germany
- State: Bavaria
- Admin. region: Niederbayern
- District: Dingolfing-Landau

Government
  - Mayor (2020–26): Matthias Kohlmayer

Area
  - Total: 84.39 km^{2} (32.58 sq mi)
- Elevation: 390 m (1,280 ft)

Population (2025-12-31)
  - Total: 14,776
  - Density: 175.1/km^{2} (453.5/sq mi)
- Time zone: UTC+01:00 (CET)
  - Summer (DST): UTC+02:00 (CEST)
- Postal codes: 94405
- Dialling codes: 09951
- Vehicle registration: DGF (formerly: LAN)
- Website: www.landau-isar.de

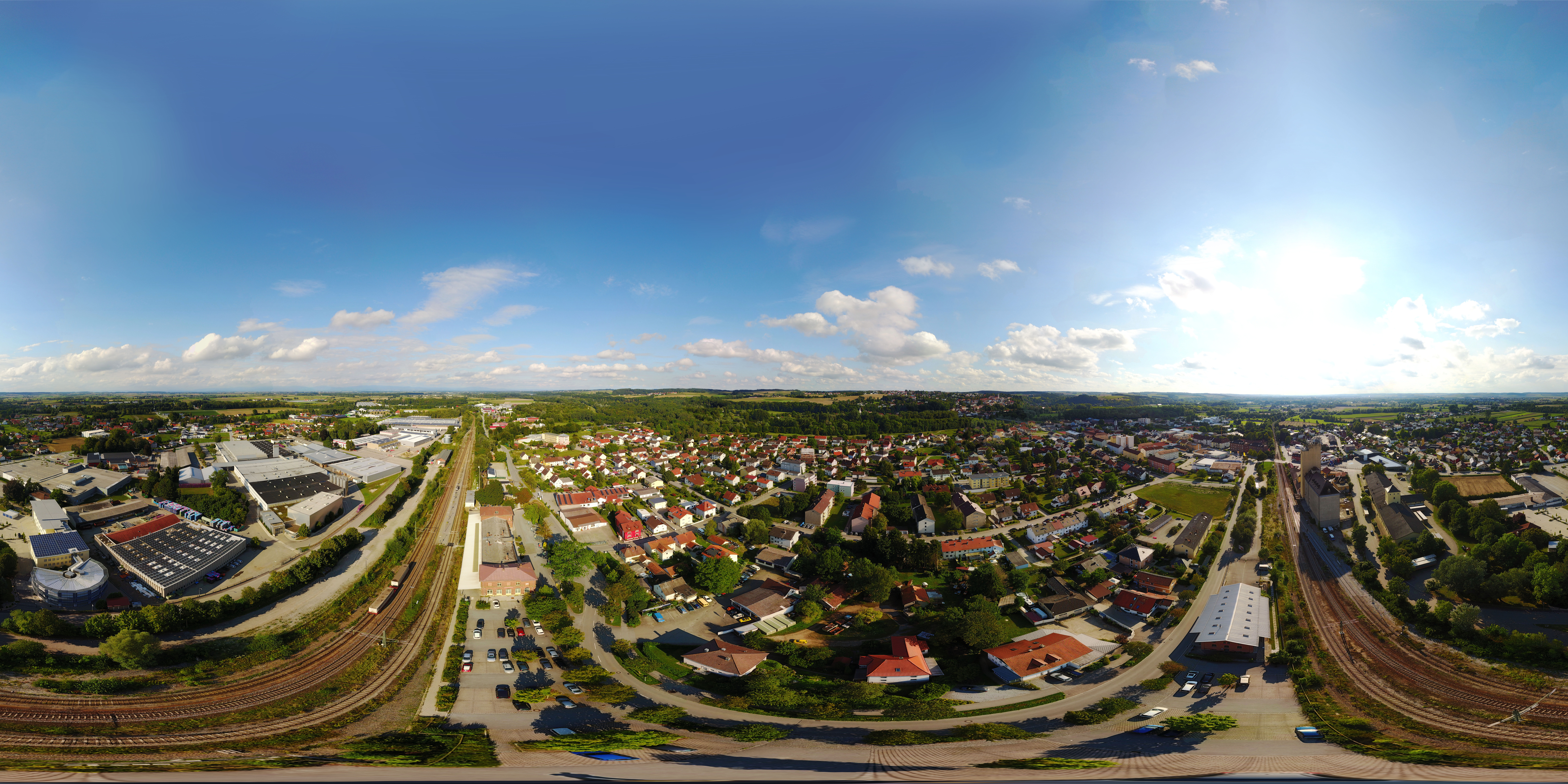
360° Panorama Landau a.d. Isar

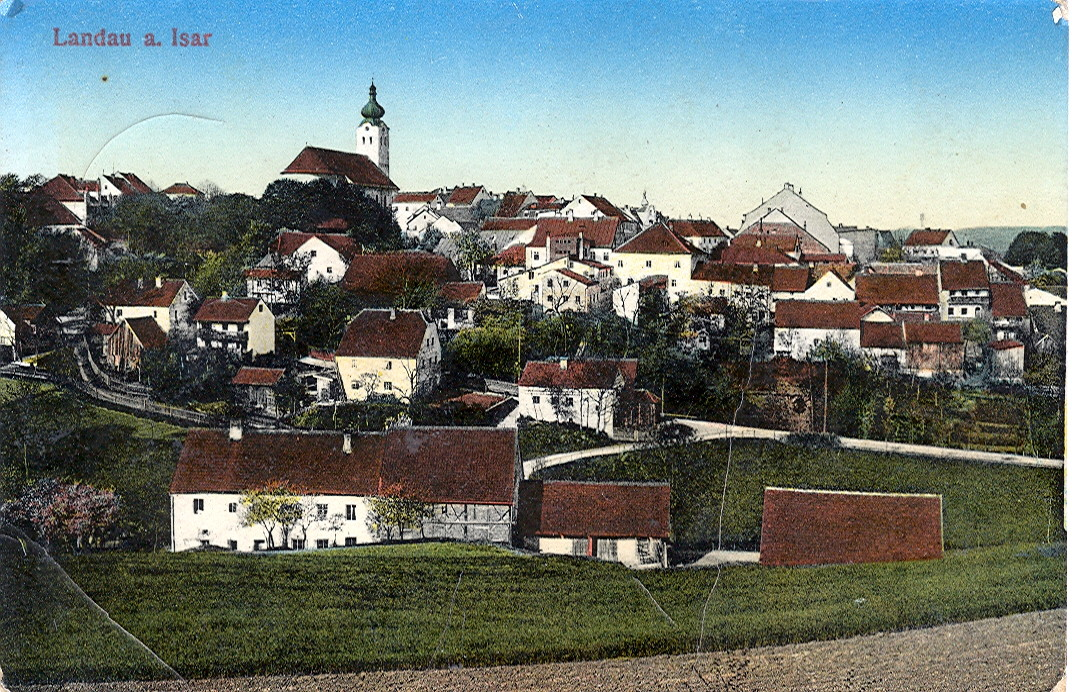
Postcard of Landau an der Isar, 1917

Landau an der Isar (German pronunciation: [ˈlandaʊ ʔan deːɐ̯ ˈʔiːzaʁ], lit. 'Landau on the Isar'; Central Bavarian: Landa an da Isar) is the second-largest town in the Lower Bavarian district, or Landkreis, of Dingolfing-Landau, in the state of Bavaria, Germany. It lies on the river Isar, 120 km downstream from Munich. In 2020, its population was around 14,000.

== History ==
Landau was founded in 1224 by the Wittelsbach Ludwig I, Duke of Bavaria. The town had been a Pflegamt for many years and belonged to the Landshut Rentamt of the Electorate-Principality (Kurfürstentum) of Bavaria. Landau possessed a town court with broad magisterial powers (Landgericht).

Until the Bavarian county reform, or Kreisreform in German, in 1972, Landau was the district seat (Kreisstadt) of its own Landkreis, having the license plate code LAN. In the reform, the former townships of Frammering, Mettenhausen, Reichersdorf and Zeholfing, along with parts of the townships of Kammern and Ganacker, were merged with the town of Landau. The incorporation of the townships of Nieder- and Oberhöcking followed in 1978.

== Celebrities ==
=== Former Landauers ===
- Manfred Böckl, author
- Uschi Glas, actress
- town pastor Johann Baptist Huber, opponent of the Nazi régime
- Norbert Niemann, author
- Amelie Schoenenwald, biologist and European Space Agency reserve astronaut
- Jakob Ziegler, mathematician

=== Honorary town citizens ===
- Alois Schlögl (1893–1957), CSU politician, member of the provincial parliament and Provincial Minister for Nutrition, Agriculture and Forestry (1948–1954)
- Arthur Piechler (1896–1974), Cathedral organist in Augsburg and composer
- Hans Kick (1917–2000), 1st Mayor (1966–1984)

== Sights to see ==
- Late Gothic parish church with important winged altar associated with Hans Leinberger in Usterling
- Town museum (Heimatmuseum)
- Town parish church of the Virgin Mary; the parish church of the Assumption of Dormition of the Mother of God (feast day: 15 August) was constructed during the tenure of the town priest Fr. Phillip Rappoldsberger von Dominikus Magazin in 1713. It counts as the largest and most beautiful Baroque church structure in the lower Isar Valley. The church interior shines with the marvellous Baroque high altar and eight side altars.
- Wildthurn Castle (Schloss Wildthurn)
- Kastenhof Landau - The museum für Stone Age and present in the Kastenhof, a historic administarative building
- The "Growing Rock" (Wachsender Felsen) in Usterling
- The Devil's Stairway (Teufelstritt) in Zulling
- The Boulder Church, or Steinfelskirche; the church "At the Thrice-Great Mother in the Rock" originates from the period after the Thirty Years' War and was constructed under Fr. Phillip Rappoldsberger. It houses many votive panels from the 17th and 18th centuries and is counted among the most important pilgrimage churches of the lower Isar Valley.

== Economy and infrastructure ==
=== Economy: prominent companies ===
- Einhell AG
- Dräxlmaier Group
- IBPmedien GmbH
- Isoflock
- Hefele KG
- Huber GmbH
- Spedition Niedermaier
- vionic Dialog- und Internetmarketing

=== Traffic/roadways ===
The town is bound by the Bundesstraße 20 and the Bundesautobahn 92 and lies on the train line Landshut–Wörth a.d.Isar–Dingolfing–Landau a.d.Isar–Wallersdorf–Plattling.

=== Government offices ===
- Juvenile Detention Centre
- Ministry for Rural Development
- Forest Ministry
- Ministry of Agriculture
- Surveying Agency
