= Makita =

Japanese manufacturer of power tools

Makita Corporation 株式会社マキタ

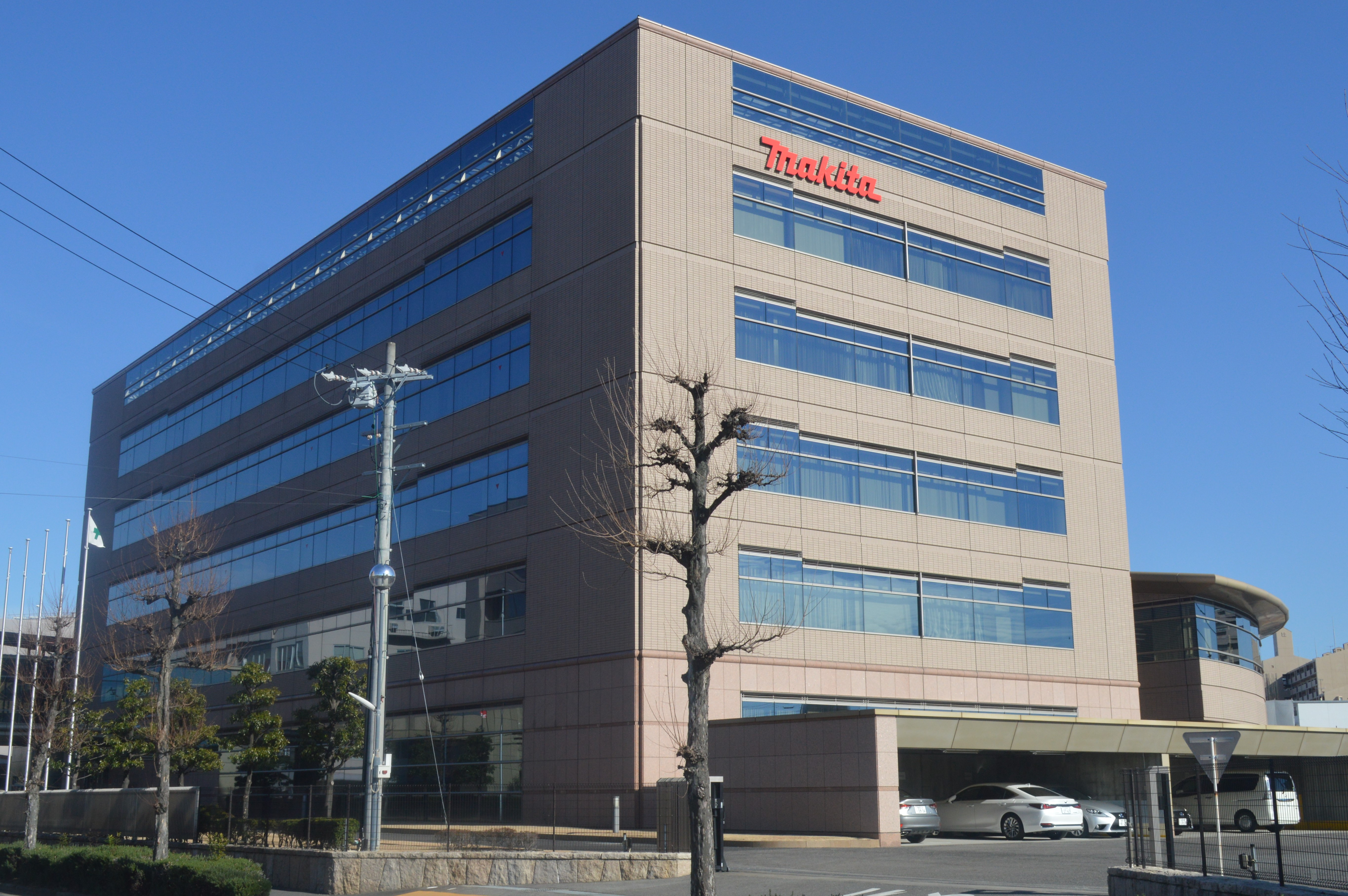
- Makita's headquarters in Anjō, Japan
- Native name: 株式会社マキタ
- Romanized name: Makita Kabushiki-gaisha
- Type: Public K.K.
- Traded as: TYO: 6586
- Industry: Power tools
- Founded: March 1915; 111 years ago
- Founder: Mosaburo Makita
- Headquarters: Anjō, Japan
- Area served: Worldwide
- Key people: Masahiko Goto (Chairman); Shiho Hori (President)
- Revenue: ▲¥753.13 billion (2025)
- Operating income: ▲¥107.03 billion (2025)
- Total assets: ▲¥1.10 trillion (2025)
- Total equity: ▲¥926.00 billion (2025)
- Number of employees: 17,641 (2025)
- Website: makita.co.jp

Makita Corporation (株式会社マキタ, kabushiki gaisha Makita) (TYO: 6586) is a Japanese manufacturer of power tools. Founded on March 21, 1915, it is based in Anjō, Japan and operates factories in Brazil, China, Japan, Romania, the United Kingdom, Germany, Thailand, and the United States.

== History ==
In March 1915, Mosaburo Makita (b. 1893) founded Makita Electric Works in Nagoya, Aichi, Japan and began selling and repairing lighting equipment, motors and transformers. In 1958, Makita marketed a portable electrical planer in Japan and became a manufacturer of power tools the following year. In April 1969, they introduced the 6500D battery-powered drill (the first rechargeable power tool available to the general public, the first battery powered drill was the c-600 released 8 years earlier in 1961 by Black and Decker). In December 1978, they launched the 6010D rechargeable drill (the first nickel cadmium battery tool). In August 1997, the 6213D rechargeable driver-drill was exhibited at the Chicago Hardware Show (the first nickel hydride battery tool). In February 2005, the TD130D (the first lithium-ion battery tool) was made available.

Makita ships many of its power tools in Systainer-compatible stacking boxes. In 2011 Makita registered a design for its own "Makpac" variant in the names of Yuji Yamamoto and Kiyozumi Kokawa.

== Products ==
The products sold by Makita around the world can be subdivided into the following categories.

=== Cordless tools ===
Makita offers many products in this area. In addition to cordless screwdrivers, cordless impact wrenches, cordless drills, and cordless jigsaws, Makita offers various other tools such as battery saws, cordless angle grinders, cordless planers, cordless metal shears, battery-powered screwdrivers, cordless slot mills, backpack vacuums, coffee makers, and even a microwave oven.

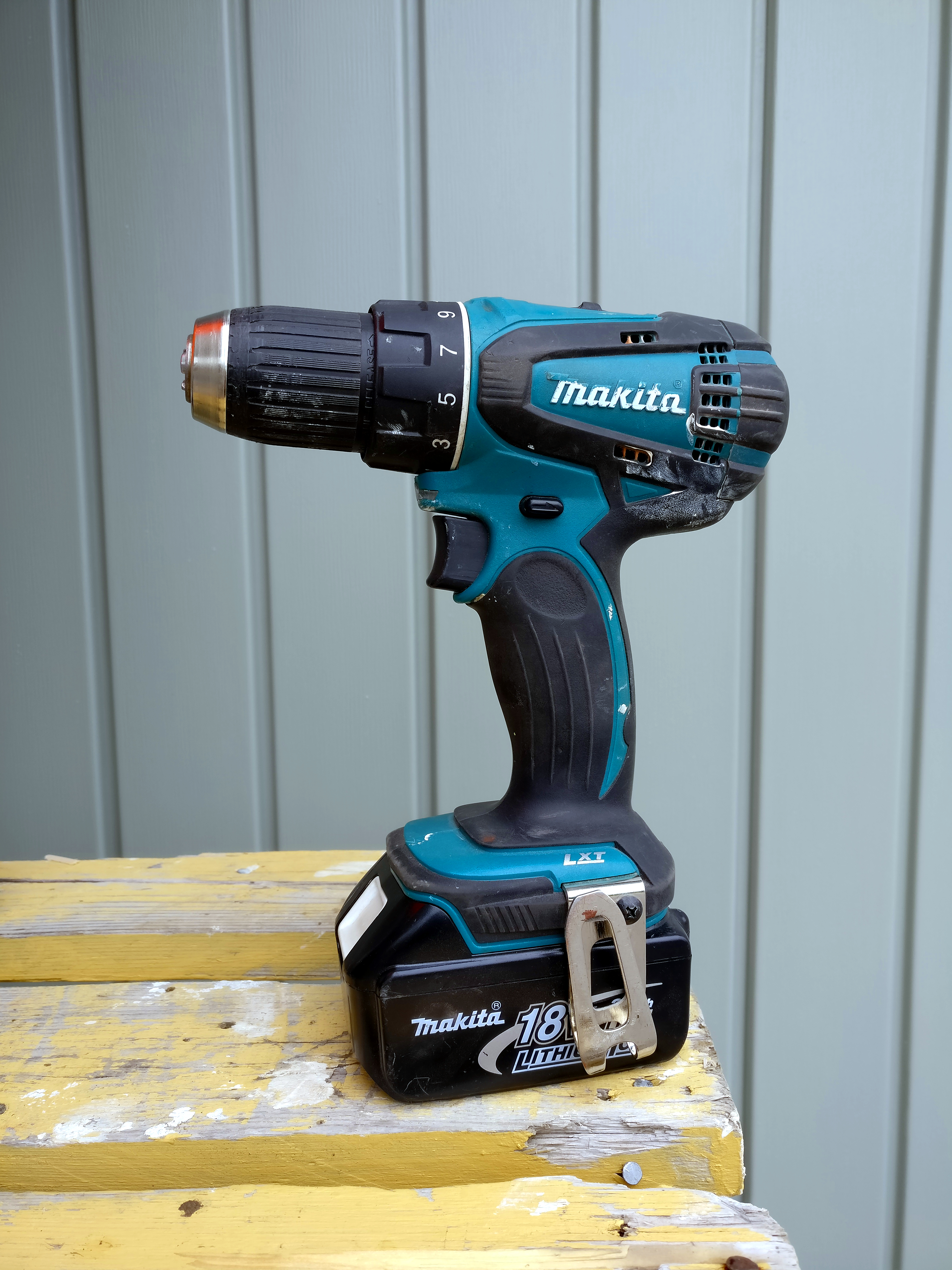
Makita Cordless Drill

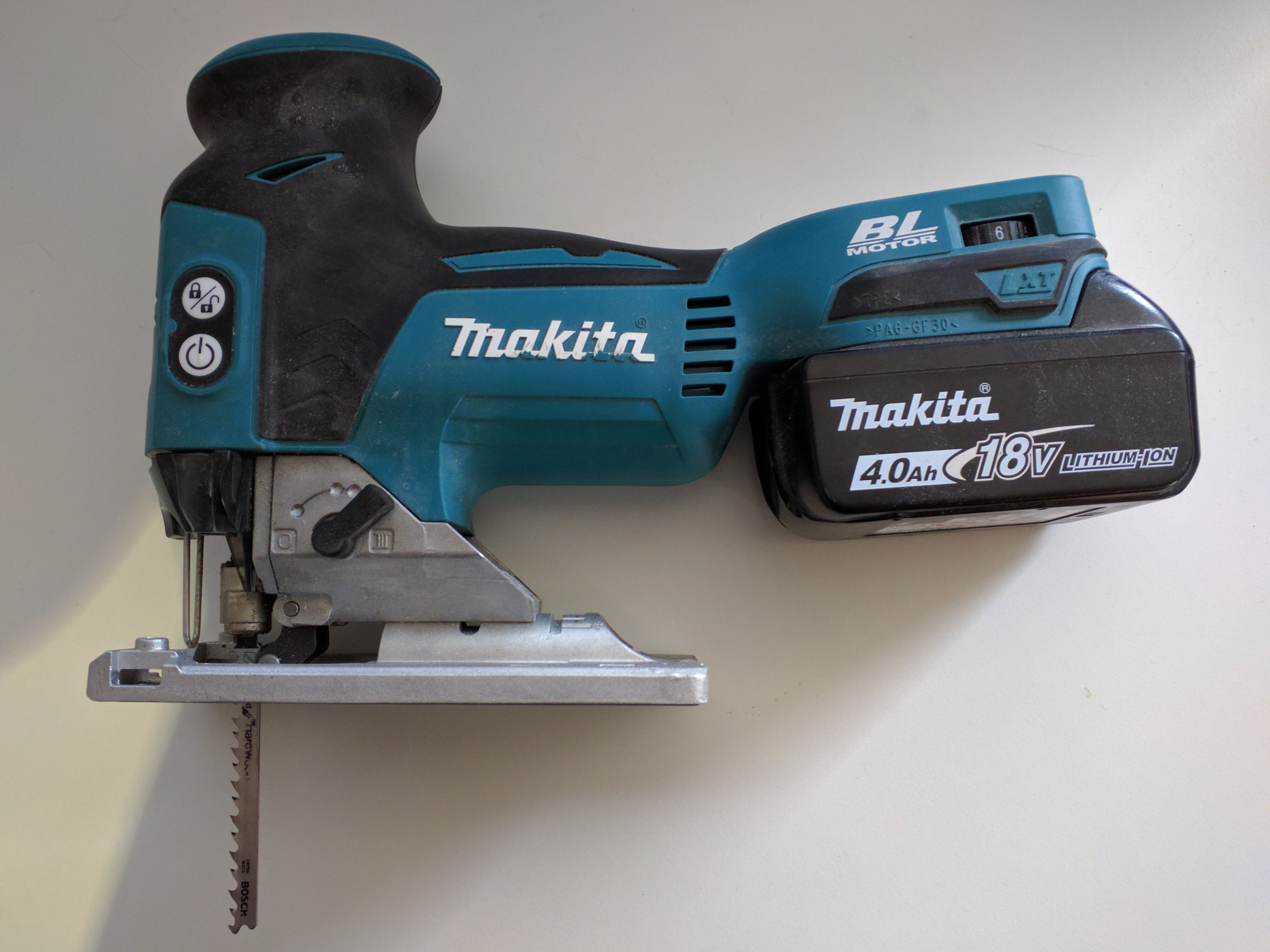
Makita Cordless Jigsaw

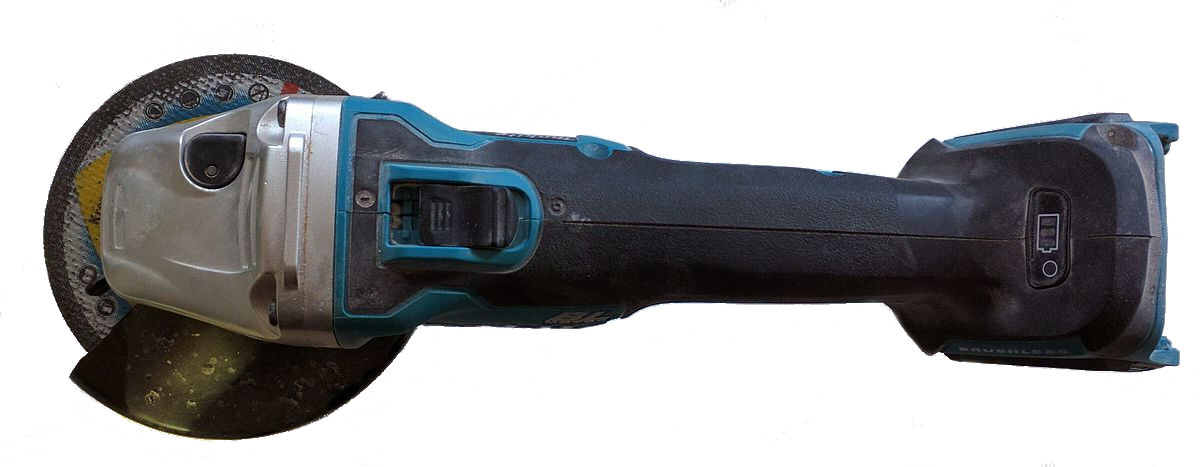
Makita Cordless angle grinder

=== Power tools ===
Makita offers classic power tools (drilling and stemming hammers, drills, planers, saws, cutting and angle grinders), gardening equipment (electric lawnmowers, high-pressure cleaners, blowers), and measuring tools (rangefinders, rotating lasers).

Makita also manufactures a range of petrol-powered tools, including cutters, power generators, chainsaws, lawnmowers, blowers, and grass trimmers.

=== Cordless tool batteries ===
Makita created the 18V lithium-ion cordless tool battery in 2005.

Makita launched the XGT 40V max line in 2020.
