= Positec =

Power and garden tool manufacturing company

Positec Tool Corporation

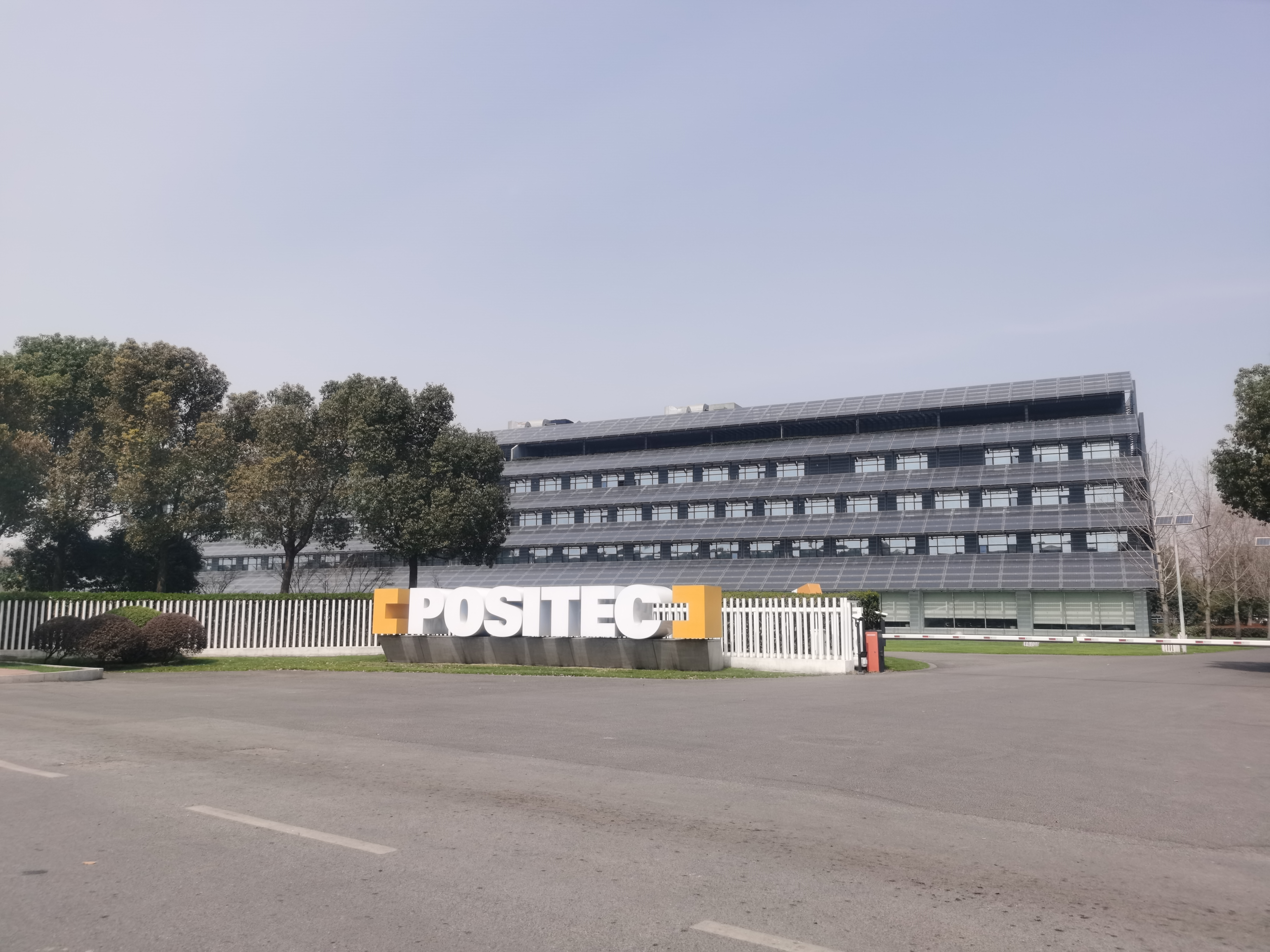
- Headquarters in Suzhou, China
- Type: Private
- Industry: Tool manufacturing
- Founded: 1994
- Founder: Don Gao
- Headquarters: Suzhou, China
- Area served: Global
- Key people: Don Gao (Founder & CEO); Tom Duncan (North American CEO); Torsten Bollweg (Europe, Middle East & Africa EMEA CEO)
- Products: Power tools; Lawn and garden equipment
- Website: www.positecgroup.com

The Positec Tool Corporation, or simply Positec, is a manufacturing company that specializes in the production of power tools and lawn and garden equipment. The company's corporate headquarters are located in Suzhou, China and the head of its North American division is located in Charlotte, North Carolina. Positec is known for its production of the Rockwell Tools, WORX and Kress brands which can be found in retailers like Lowe's, Home Depot, Costco, and Walmart.

== History ==
The Positec Tool Corporation was founded by Don Gao in 1994 in Suzhou, China. The term "Positec" is a play on "Positive Technology." The company was initially started as an original equipment manufacturer of hand and power tools for established companies and brands like Sears and Black & Decker. In one of the company's early years, they shipped an order of 700,000 angle grinders to Black & Decker. Later, Black & Decker would stop ordering from Positec to focus on manufacturing its own tools.

After this, Gao began to steer the company toward becoming an independent manufacturer and seller of branded products. In 2004, the company released the WORX line of lawn and garden equipment. Gao hired Paolo Andriolo, a designer based in Vicenza, Italy, to design "ergonomic" products for Positec. The flagship product was an electronic lawn trimmer called the WORX GT. Around the time of the WORX release, Don Gao met Tom Duncan, a former executive at the Vermont American Tool Company (a joint venture between the Emerson Electric Company and the Robert Bosch Tool Group). After quitting his job at Vermont American, Duncan acquired the rights to the "Rockwell" brand which hadn't been used for power tools since 1981. Gao and Duncan partnered up, with Duncan becoming the head of Positec's North American division in Charlotte, North Carolina in 2005.

Positec initially struggled to find buyers for their products. Retailers liked the products Positec produced, but they wanted to use their own branding (instead of WORX or Rockwell). In order to bypass this restriction, Duncan (along with Vice President of Direct Response, Rhonda Tate) decided to engage in a direct response marketing campaign. The company ran its first infomercial for the WORX GT in March 2007. By December 2007, the company had sold 313,000 units. The company had produced 10 long-form infomercials for the Rockwell Tools and WORX brands by 2012.

Positec officially released the Rockwell Tools line in 2007. Both Rockwell Tools and WORX products first appeared in a retailer in October 2009 at Lowe's. By 2012, their products could be found in other major retailers like The Home Depot, Walmart, and Costco. In order to accommodate increased sales, Positec USA moved its distribution center from Long Beach, California to Huntersville, North Carolina in 2012. By 2014, the company employed 4,000 people in 12 subsidiaries throughout the world. It also maintained facilities in numerous nations, including the United States, China, Spain, Brazil, Australia, and Canada.

2017: investment in the (bankrupt) german company Kress Elektrowerkzeuge.

== Products ==
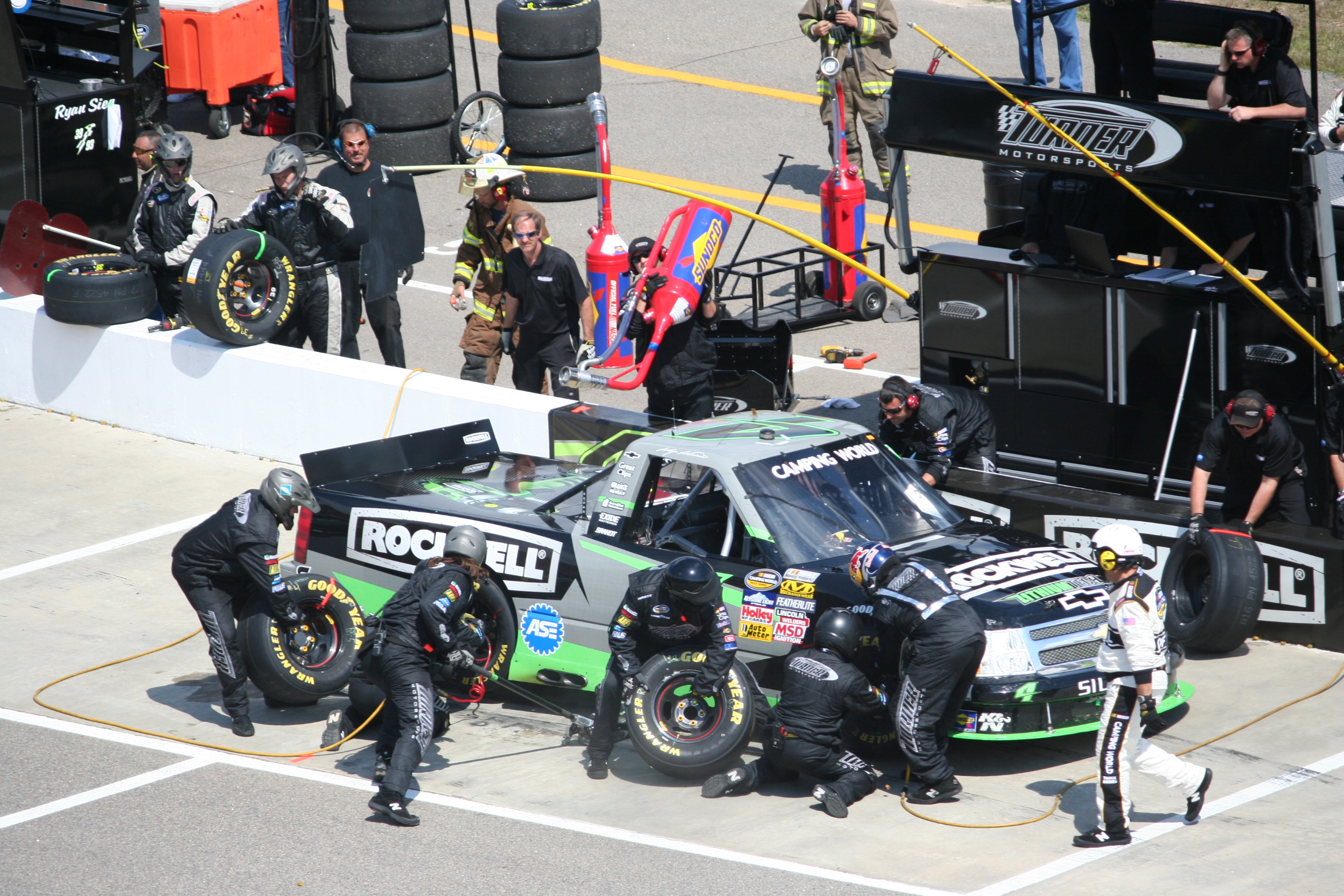
Kasey Kahne at Rockingham Speedway driving the #4 Truck sponsored by Positec brand Rockwell Tools.

Positec produces, distributes, and sells products under two major brand names: WORX and Rockwell Tools. WORX is a line of lawn and garden equipment that includes products like lawn trimmers, lawn mowers, chainsaws, leaf blowers, yard carts, and accessories. Rockwell Tools is a line of power tools and hand tools that consists of products like circular saws, drills, angle grinders, and specialty tools like the oscillating SoniCrafter and the Jawhorse clamping device. More recently, Positec began manufacturing a limited line of light-duty lawn and garden tools for German discount retailer Aldi in the USA under their private brands Ferrex (which replaced the WorkZone label) and Gardenline. Positec also make WESCO, Bauker, Xceed and Blue Ridge brands, and licensed the Cat brand for electric power tools and lawn & garden equipment.

== Recognition and awards ==
In 2010, retailer Lowe's honored Positec with the Supplier of the Year Award. Lowe's also named Positec the "Innovator of the Year" among their 2,500 other suppliers. The company's WORX GT lawn trimmer also received an award from the U.S. Electronic Retailing Association in 2010. In 2011, Positec received awards from DIY Week for Product of the Year in the power tool and garden tools categories. In 2013, the World Wildlife Fund presented Positec with the Platinum Low Carbon Award for its sustainable manufacturing facilities in China.
