= Tom Duncan (businessman) =

American entrepreneur and business executive

- Education: University of Virginia; University of South Carolina (M.B.A.)
- Occupation: CEO of Positec

Tom Duncan is an American entrepreneur and business executive who is the current President and CEO of the North American division of the Positec Tool Corporation. He was previously an executive for the Vermont American Tool Company, which was a joint venture between the Robert Bosch Tool Group and the Emerson Electric Company. He has been featured in publications and media like The New York Times, The Wall Street Journal, and the Bloomberg Television program, Taking Stock.

== Early life and education ==
Tom Duncan grew up in Nashville, Tennessee. He has indicated that his early interest in tools was a product of his father's penchant for home improvement when Duncan was a child. Duncan attended the University of Virginia where he earned a business degree. He then took a job at Lawler Ballard Advertising in Nashville, Tennessee where he wrote sales brochures and managed accounts. He would quit that job to attend the University of South Carolina's Moore School of Business where he earned an M.B.A. in International Business Studies. He also took an intensive course in the German language and spent 8 months in Germany as an intern at a packaging machinery company. He would graduate from the M.B.A. program in 1991.

== Career ==
After earning his M.B.A., Duncan was recruited by the Germany-based Robert Bosch Tool Group to work at the Vermont American Tool Company, which was jointly owned with the Emerson Electric Company. He was promoted to Vice President of Vermont American in 1998, and remained in that position when Bosch purchased the company outright. He left the Robert Bosch Tool Group in 2003 with the intention of starting his own business.

He acquired the rights to use the "Rockwell" brand name for power tools in 2004. The brand name had not been in use for tools since the 1980s. In 2004, he also met Don Gao, the CEO of the Positec Tool Corporation based in Suzhou, China. Duncan partnered with Gao and became the head of Positec's North American division in 2005. There, he began marketing and selling WORX and Rockwell products to American consumers. Early on, Duncan and Positec had difficulty selling their products to major American retailers like Lowe's and The Home Depot. The retailers wanted to use their own brand names for the products rather than Positec's WORX and Rockwell Tools brands.

Because Duncan wanted to maintain the private branding of the products, he and his Positec staff opted for direct response marketing in the form of infomercials. The company launched its first infomercial for the battery-powered WORX GT lawn trimmer in March 2007. By the end of that year, the company had sold over 300,000 WORX GT units. During that year, the company also launched the Rockwell Tools line of power tools and accessories. In October 2009, Duncan helped Positec become a supplier of Lowe's, and, in 2010, Lowe's named Positec its "Innovator of the Year."

By 2012, Duncan had helped oversee Positec's inclusion in additional retailers like Costco, Walmart, and The Home Depot. He was also instrumental in moving the company's distribution facility from Long Beach, California to Huntersville, North Carolina, which is closer to the company's headquarters in Charlotte.
