= WORX =

Brand of lawn and garden equipment

Worx
- Product type: Lawn and garden equipment, DIY power tools
- Current owner: Positec Tool Corporation
- Country: China, USA
- Introduced: 2004
- Website: www.worx.com

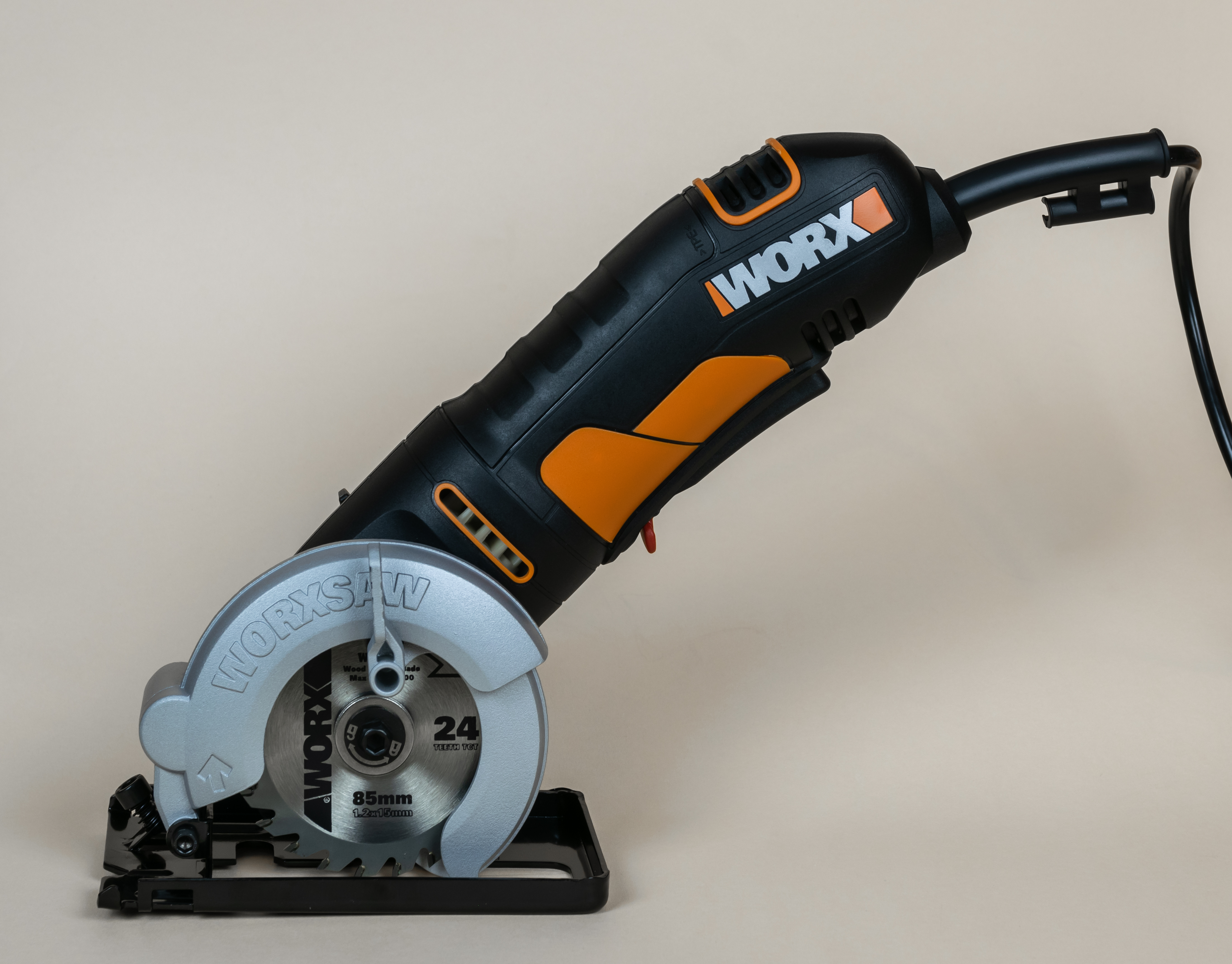
Small handheld circular saw by Worx

Worx (styled WORX in the company's logo), is a line of lawn and garden equipment and power tools owned and distributed by the Positec Tool Corporation, a manufacturing company based in Suzhou, China, with North American headquarters in Charlotte, North Carolina. The brand is known primarily for its lawn and garden tools like trimmers, lawn mowers, and chainsaws. In North America, Worx products can be found at numerous major retailers including Lowe's, Walmart, Home Depot, Canadian Tire, and Costco. The brand is also sold on other continents, such as in Europe.

== History ==
The Positec Tool Corporation was founded in Suzhou, China, by Don Gao in 1994. For most of its early years, Positec sold OEM power tools to companies and brands like Black & Decker. Gao wanted to branch out by creating a line of lawn and garden equipment using his own branding. Positec launched early versions of Worx tools in China in 2004. One of the first Worx products sold was an electric lawn trimmer called the Worx GT.

Also in 2004, Gao met Tom Duncan, an entrepreneur and former executive at Vermont American, a company owned by the Robert Bosch Tool Group of Germany. Duncan brought the Rockwell Tools brand name under the umbrella of Positec and became the head of the company's North American division in 2005. He would eventually sell both the WORX and Rockwell brands from the headquarters in Charlotte, North Carolina.

Positec initially had trouble selling Worx products to major retailers because those retailers wanted to sell them as an in-house brand (rather than an independent brand). In order to sell under the Worx brand name, the company decided to employ direct response marketing including the use of infomercials. The Worx GT electric trimmer was the first Positec product to be sold using an infomercial in the United States in early 2007. By the end of that year, the company had sold 313,000 Worx GT units.

The first retailer in which Worx products appeared was Lowe's in October 2009. By 2012, the Worx brand was in Walmart, Costco, and The Home Depot (among others). Also in 2012, Positec's increased sales required the company to move its U.S. distribution center from Long Beach, California to Huntersville, North Carolina to be closer to the headquarters in Charlotte.

== Products ==
The Worx brand is composed of numerous lawn and garden tools. The brand's flagship product was the Worx GT, a lightweight electric trimmer. Updated iterations of the Worx GT continue to be made and sold by Positec. Worx is also known for selling items like lawn mowers and chainsaws. It offers cordless electric lawn mowers that run exclusively on battery power and have zero carbon emissions. In 2014, Worx released a fully robotic lawn mower (dubbed the "Worx Landroid") that will mow the lawn, returning to a charging station if the battery begins to run low. The Worx JawSaw is a chainsaw with a partially enclosed blade that is designed for safety.

Other products include leaf blowers, yard carts, and other accessories. The Worx TriVac is a cordless electric leaf blower that doubles as a vacuum. The Worx AeroCart is a wheelbarrow-like yard cart that features 8 different functions.

== Recognition and awards ==
In 2011, Positec was honored with the Product of the Year award by DIY Week in the garden tools category for the Worx TriVac leaf blower/vacuum and the Eco cordless lawn mower.
