= Brushcutter =

Brushcutter may refer to:

- A device usually mounted to a vehicle for forestry mulching
- Brushcutter (garden tool), a hand-held powered tool used for trimming weeds and other foliage
