= Electric motor brake =

An electric motor brake (commonly referred to as an electric brake) is a safety feature incorporated into many modern power tools, such as circular saws, drills, and miter saws. Many manufacturers implement this feature into tools specifically with a spinning blade or cutter.

== Usage in corded tools ==
An electric brake is commonly used in corded tools such as circular saws, miter saws, routers, bandsaws, angle grinders, and more recently, table saws. These mechanisms are designed to prevent injuries resulting from things like kickback or skin-to-blade contact. The way these mechanisms work are almost universally the same; when the trigger or switch is released, the polarity of the electricity running to the motor's brushes is reversed, which decelerates the motor to a stop much quicker than it otherwise would. In circular saws, this feature can reduce the risk of the saw jolting backwards when the saw is set down, as well as prevent damage to the cord or the user. In other tools (such as miter saws or table saws), the brake can reduce the risk of injury to an operator's fingers or hands when the saw is switched off (such as when grabbing a scrap piece off the table). The disadvantage of this feature is that it wears the brushes prematurely when compared to non-brake tools. The first use of an electric brake on a tool was that of the miter saw, invented in 1964 by Ed Niehaus, a tool engineer for Rockwell Tools. Since then, a number of manufacturers have incorporated brakes into their power tools.

== Usage in cordless tools ==
Electric brakes on cordless tools have been prevalent since the invention of the first cordless drill by Makita in 1969. They are found on most cordless tools, with the exception of cordless vacuums and blowers, etc., where such a feature offers no benefit. The way the brake on cordless tools works is slightly different than in corded models; when the switch is released, the motor terminals are shorted together, causing the motor to stop almost instantly by dissipating the rotational energy in the windings. This method is practical for the small permanent-magnet motors in cordless tools, which have low inertia, and is applicable to both brushed and brushless variants. This would not work on corded tools, as they generally use wound field magnets instead of permanent magnets.
