= Cleaning (forestry) =

Practice in forestry

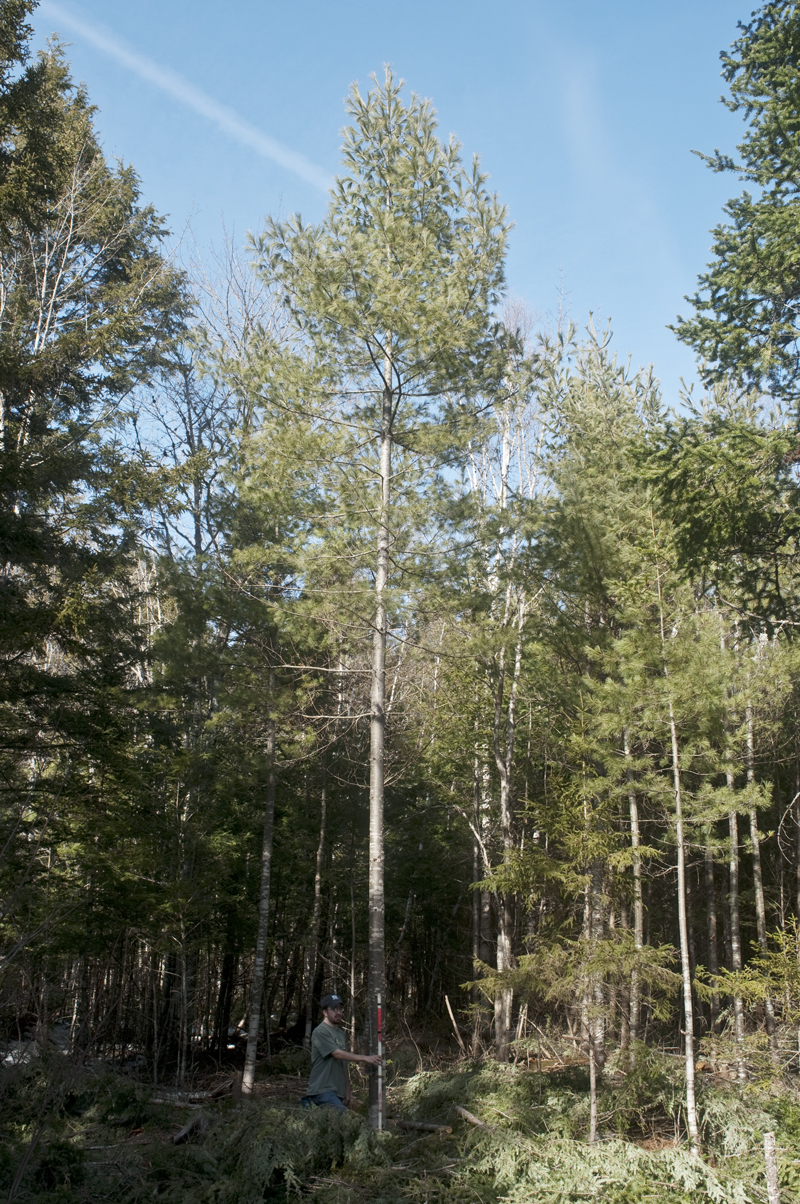
Eastern white pine after weeding (large tree, center) or cleaning (small tree, right). The distinction between these is the height of the crop tree relative to its competitors, which have been removed, but were equal to the height of the larger pine.

Cleaning or weeding is the practice of selecting particularly desirable trees in a young stand and removing or killing trees that threaten their survival or development.

More specifically, cleaning is the removal or killing of over-topping competitors that are significantly taller than the desired trees while weeding is the removal of mainly herbaceous plants and shrubs that are of the same height (but still competing for the resources that could be used by the selected trees). Cleaning is usually done in the sapling stage while weeding is usually done in the seedling stage. Cleaning can also be carried out in a crop which has not crossed the sapling stage and it is defined as the cutting made in order to face the best individual form undesirable one of the same age which interfere or likely with the growth of the desired individuals

Colloquially, these treatments are often referred to as crop tree release when they are practiced in sapling sized stands.

Cleaning is common in softwood plantations, clearcuts, and over story removals, where the desired conifers are over topped by rapidly growing early-successional hardwood species. Herbicides are often used in these cleaning operations because the correct chemical at the correct dose (e.g. glyphosate or triclopyr) and time will kill only broad leaved species, leaving the conifers unharmed and free to grow. Chemical treatments may be applied by foliage sprays, mists or pellets. This can be from a vehicle or by aerial spraying. Where chemicals are impractical or unpalatable to the landowner, a brush cutter is used to cut competing trees close to the ground.

Other methods of cleaning include mowing with brush hogs attached to a tractor.

== Overview ==
Foresters will often conduct these treatments as early as possible, but not so early that new growth of hardwoods can overtake the planted seedlings again. Their goal is to maintain the health and vigor of tree species that are preferred for some use, often structural material.

Liberation cutting is similar to cleaning, with the exception that the competing trees are much older than the desired trees.

Cleaning is often done at a later stage, to allocate growing space to selected individuals that have demonstrated superior quality. This usually means a straight trunk that will make a good saw log, or perhaps a healthy crown on a mast-producing tree. In any case, desirable qualities have been identified in each particular tree, and competing trees are removed to promote the desired trees.

To help distinguish between cleaning and weeding, consider these two images from the northeastern United States. Both pictures focus on an eastern white pine of good future sawlog quality. In the first, the short-lived and undesired balsam fir has over topped the pine: the good quality pine will likely die. This is a cleaning situation, albeit an abnormally late one. In the second, the balsam fir compete from the sides: the good quality pine will almost certainly not die, but it is ready to grow more quickly. This is a normal weeding situation.

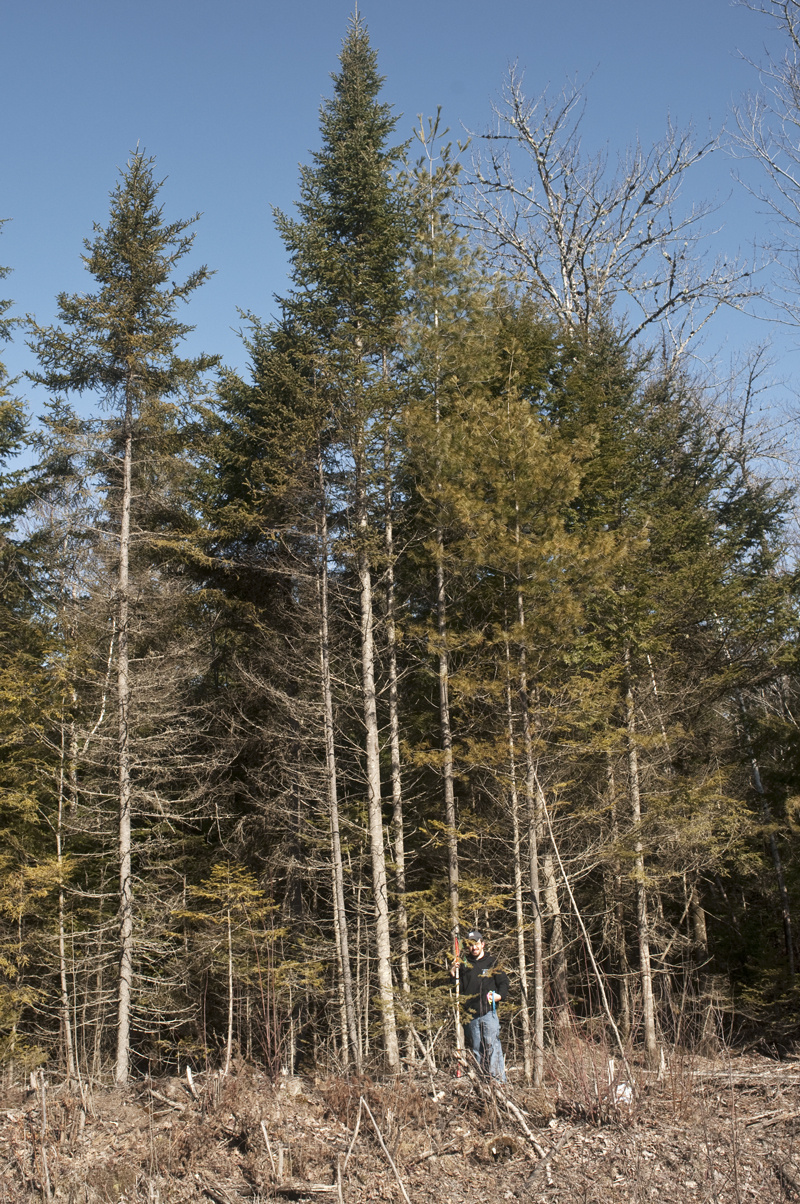
Cleaning

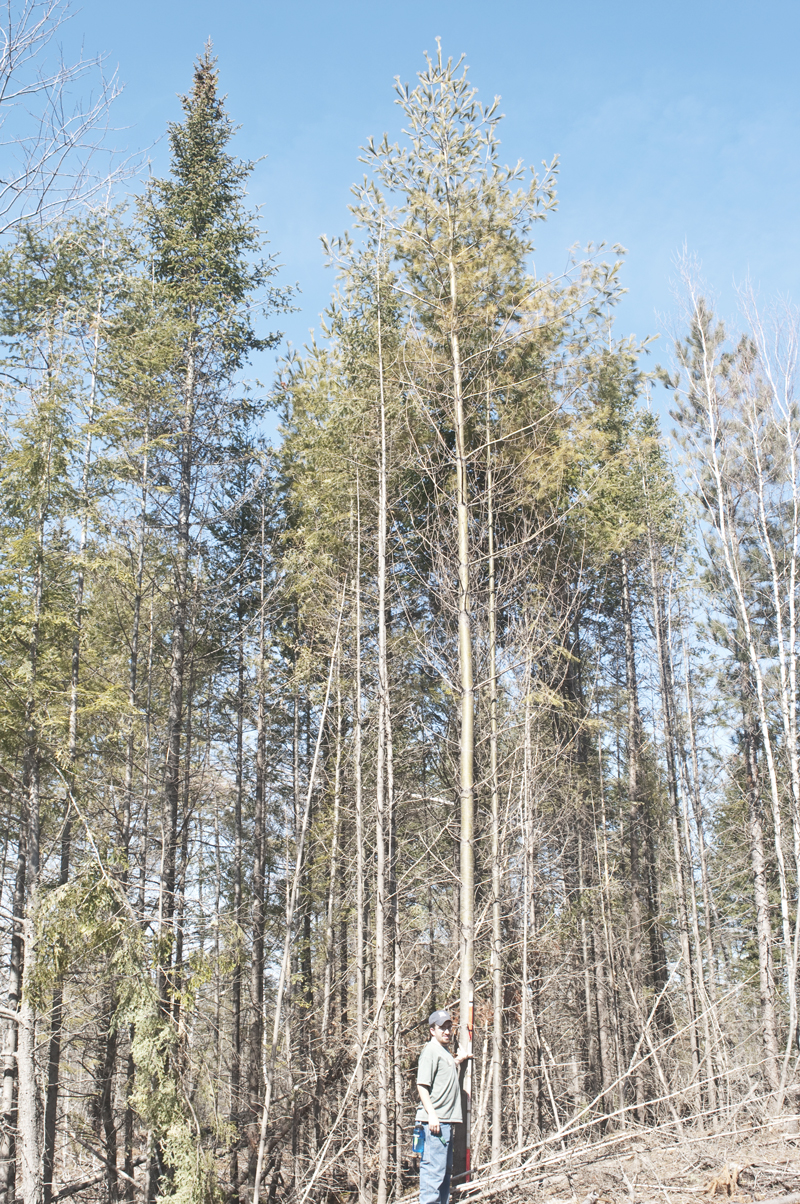
Weeding

In many situations where the trees are in the late sapling stage, the distinction between cleaning and weeding is blurred from tree to tree: this example provides a distinction that is not always made in practice. Most cleanings are conducted at the seedling stage with herbicides in plantations and clearcuts in order to control the species composition and guide the stand to a desired future condition as early as possible. This treatment is a standard and well developed feature of management on large landbases that produce pulp and softwood lumber for building.

Later intervention is usually a cleaning, and requires a certain amount of brute force and precision. Small woodlot owners often perform this operation in large sapling sized stands that have been acquired from defunct timber companies. They do this to improve the quality of their woodlots and to produce their own firewood. Competing trees at this stage are often large enough to burn, but small enough for fit and properly trained landowners to comfortably handle felling and transporting.

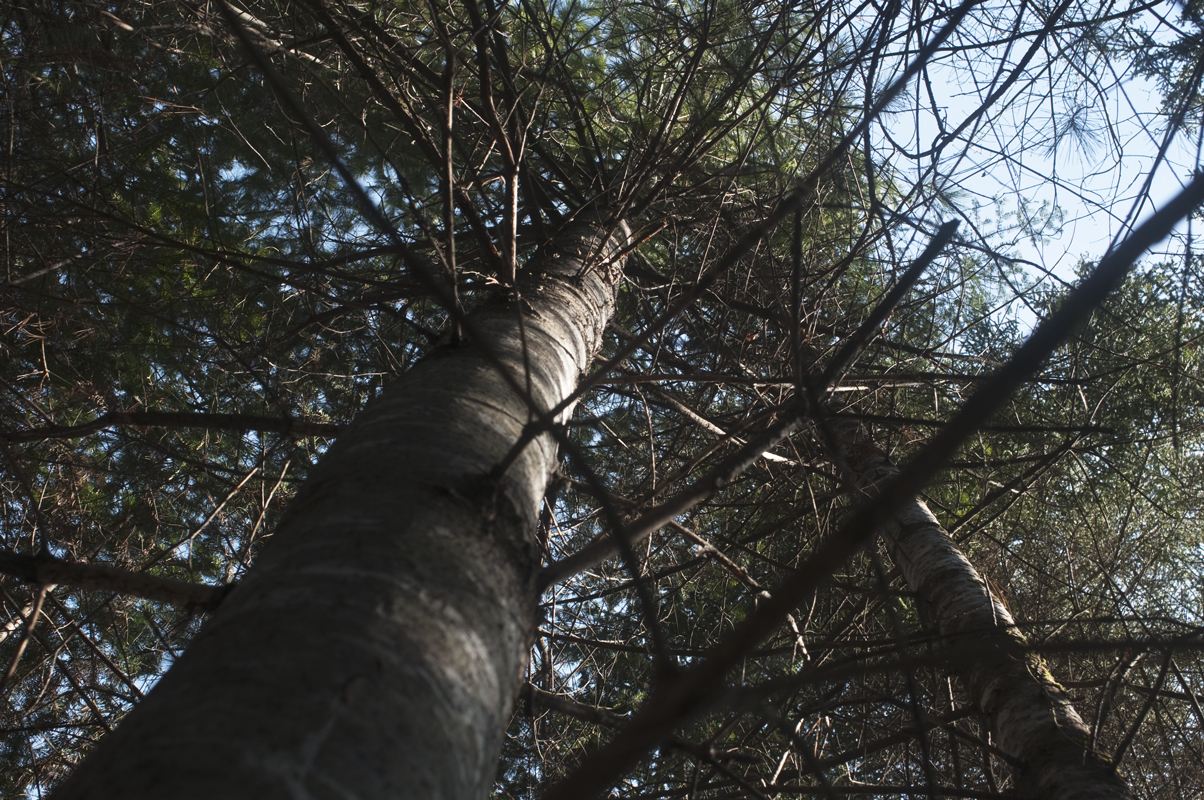
Eastern white pine in need of weeding

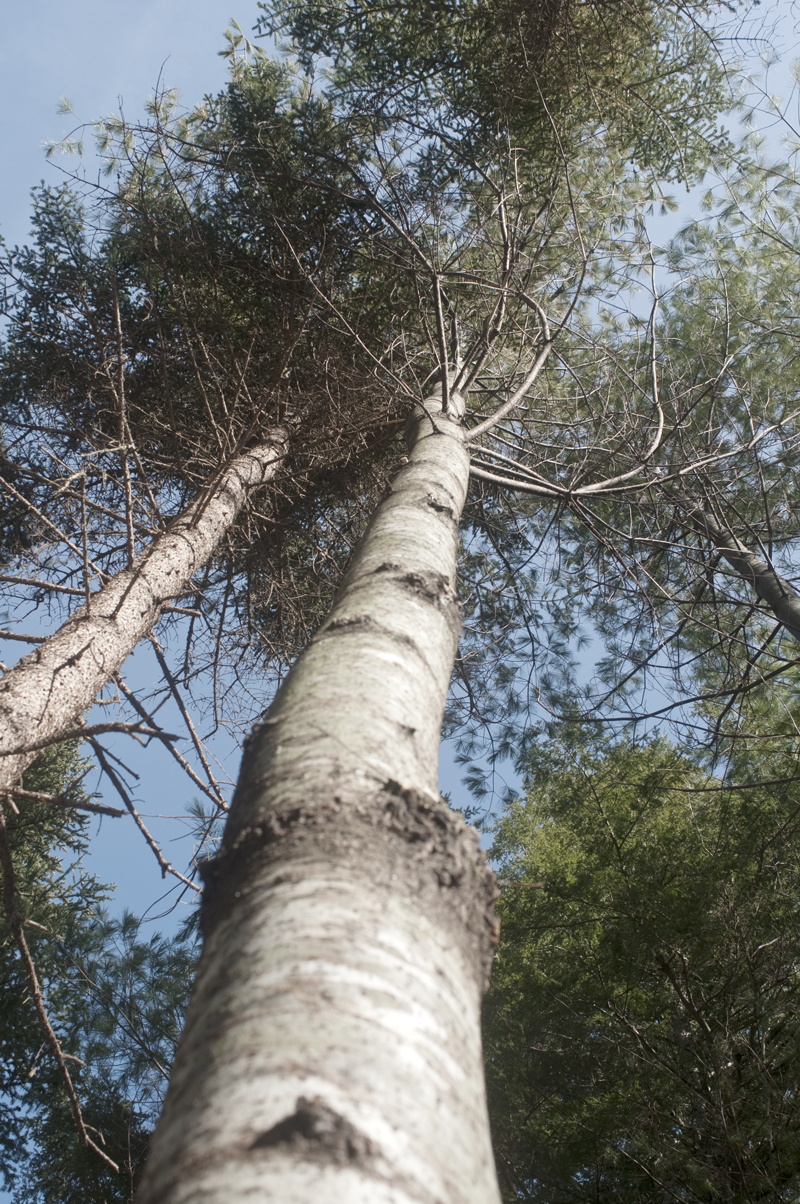
Weeding in progress

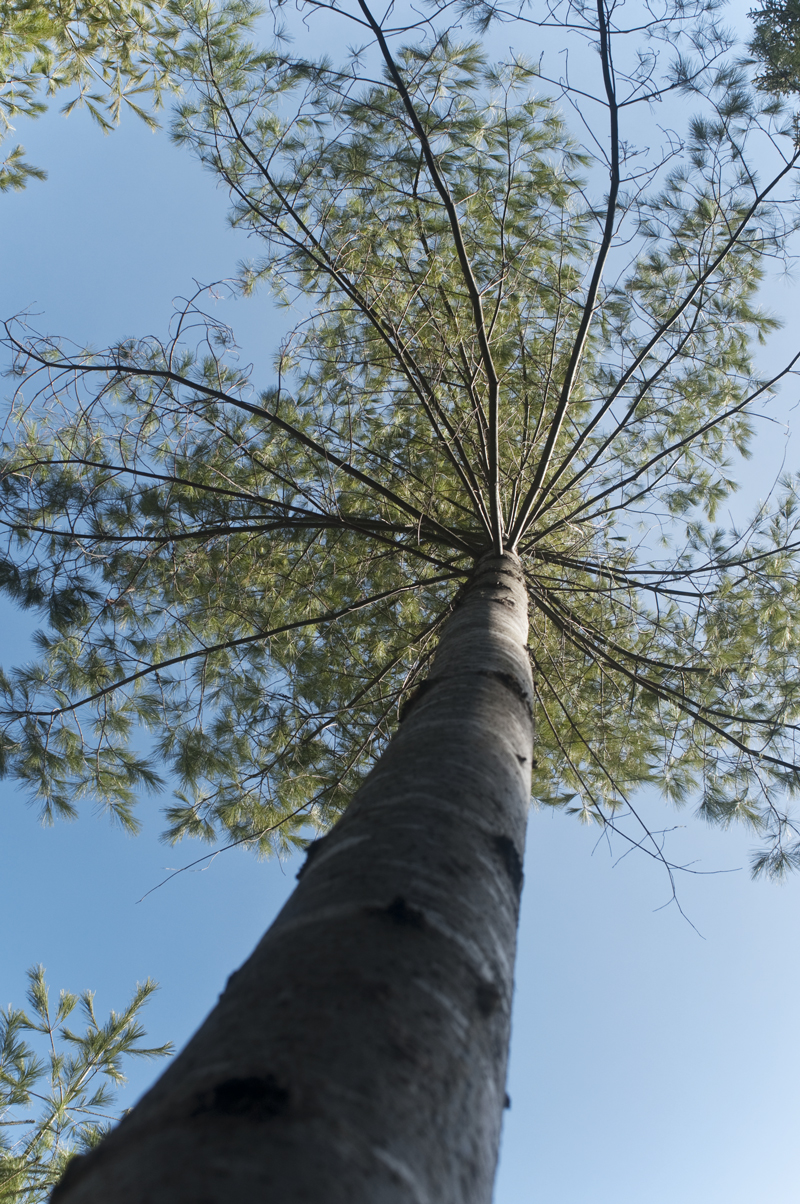
Weeding completed

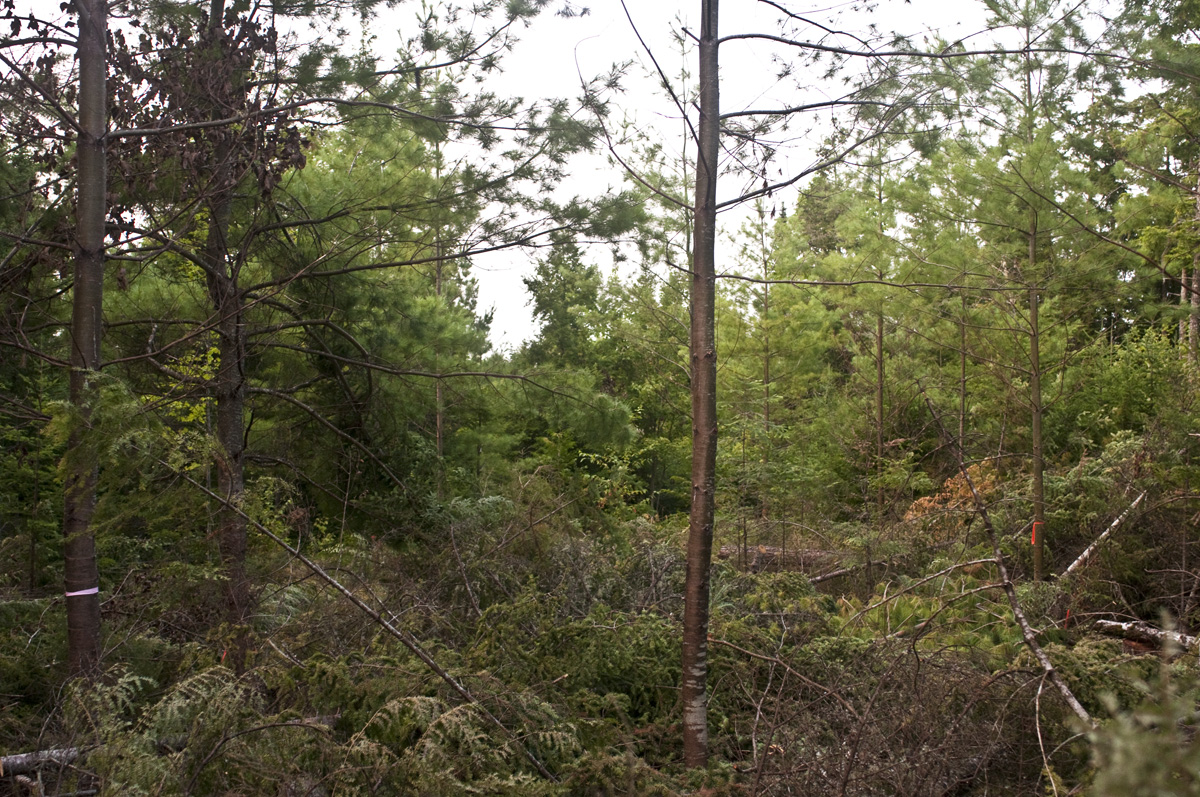
Brush after a weeding operation, before firewood collection

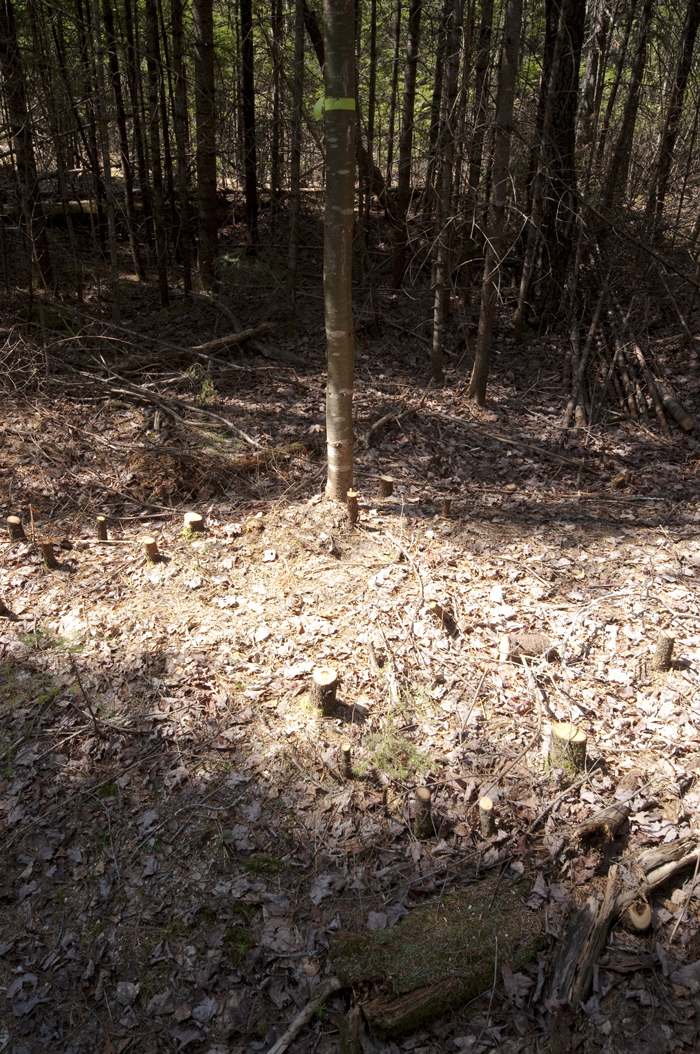
Aftermath of a weeding operation with all brush removed

To conceptualize the allocation of growing space, imagine a party where there is one pizza: if there are ten guests, each gets one slice and wants more, but if there are only one or two guests they are well fed. Trees get their energy from the sun, and there is only so much sunlight falling on a given area. If that area is occupied by a very large number of trees, each receives a small portion. There may be a lot of energy being captured, but it is being distributed between so many stems that none grow very quickly.

If the growing space is occupied by fewer trees (but still enough to eventually grow into a closed canopy), each will receive a greater portion of energy and the individuals will grow in diameter faster, yield a heartier seed crop, and produce more defensive compounds to respond to wounds, drought, and insect attack.

== See also ==
- Methods of thinning
