= Brushcutter (garden tool) =

Powered garden tool

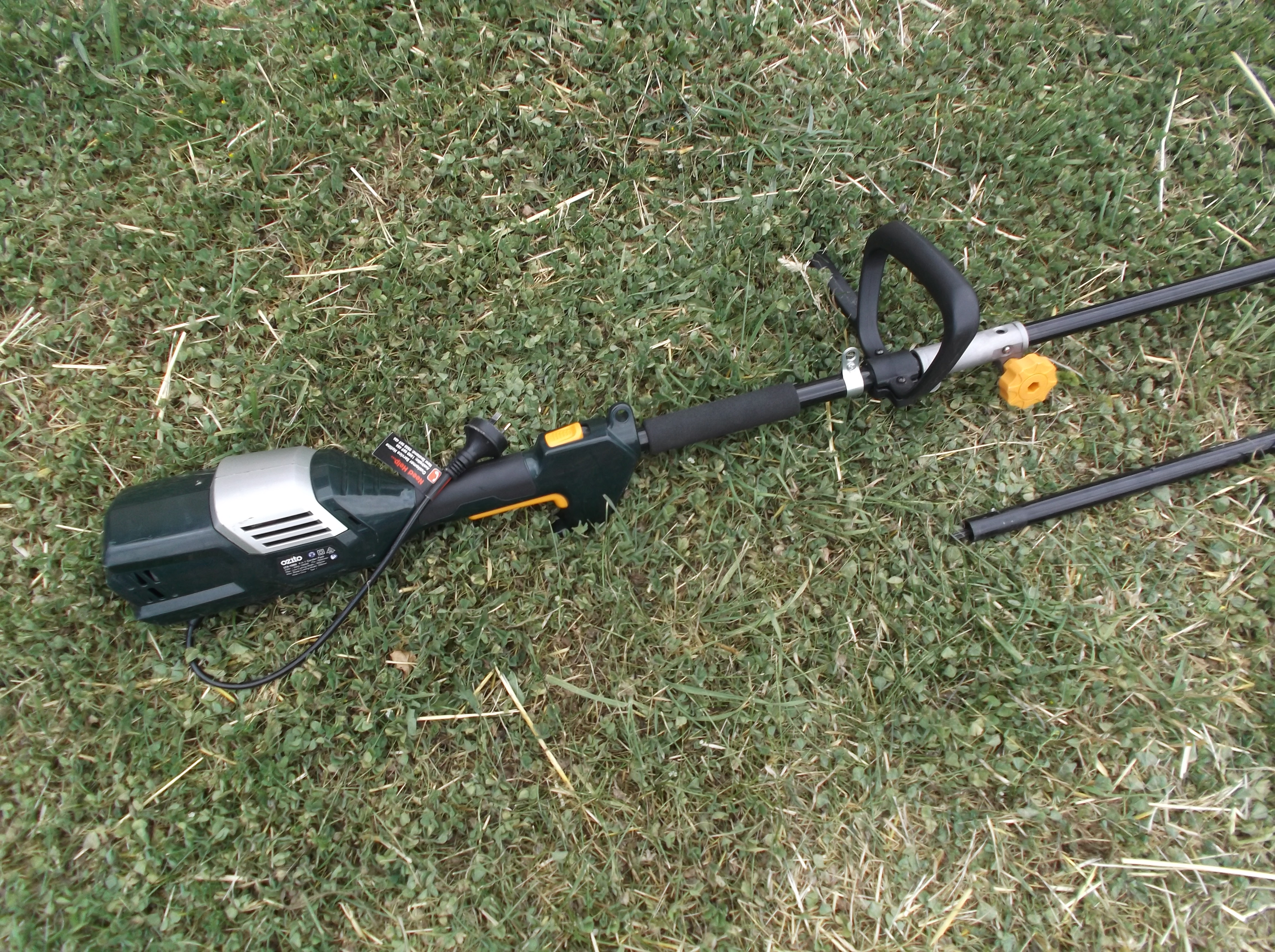
The power unit of a 240 V electric brushcutter

A brushcutter (also called a brush saw, clearing saw or gasoline goat) is a powered garden or agricultural tool used to trim weeds, small trees, and other foliage not accessible by a lawn mower or rotary mower. Various blades or trimmer heads can be attached to the machine for specific applications.

It consists of:

- A power unit held close to the body.
- A pole through which the power is transmitted.
- A rotary cutting head at the opposite end of the pole to the power unit.

== Power units ==
There are three main types of power unit:

- Gas engines, either two or four stroke, are used on the more powerful units.
- Electric motors connected to mains power by a power cord.
- Cordless electric motors powered by rechargeable batteries.

== Shaft ==
There are three types of shaft:

- Basic consumer units use a curved shaft, similar to a basic line trimmer.
- More professional units use a straight shaft with a gearbox at the cutting head end.
- Top-of-the-line units use a straight "split" shaft with a disconnection point partway along the shaft, allowing the cutting head to be replaced by other accessories such as pole pruners, cultivators, edgers and hedge trimmers.

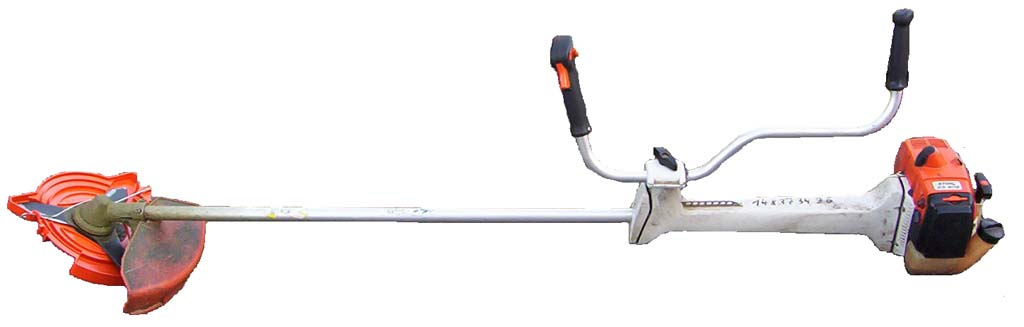
Bike handlebar style brushcutter ready for transport. To use, the handlebars are rotated and the red blade guard removed.

Handles vary on brush cutters, depending on the weight and size of the unit. Larger, more powerful brushcutters employ handlebars — a handle on either side of the shaft, similar to bike handlebars — whilst smaller units use a D-shaped handle mounted on the shaft. Heavier saws usually require a harness for safety and reduced fatigue. The shaft on units requiring a harness will have multiple attachment points, so that the entire unit may be adjusted and balanced by users of differing height.

== Cutting head ==
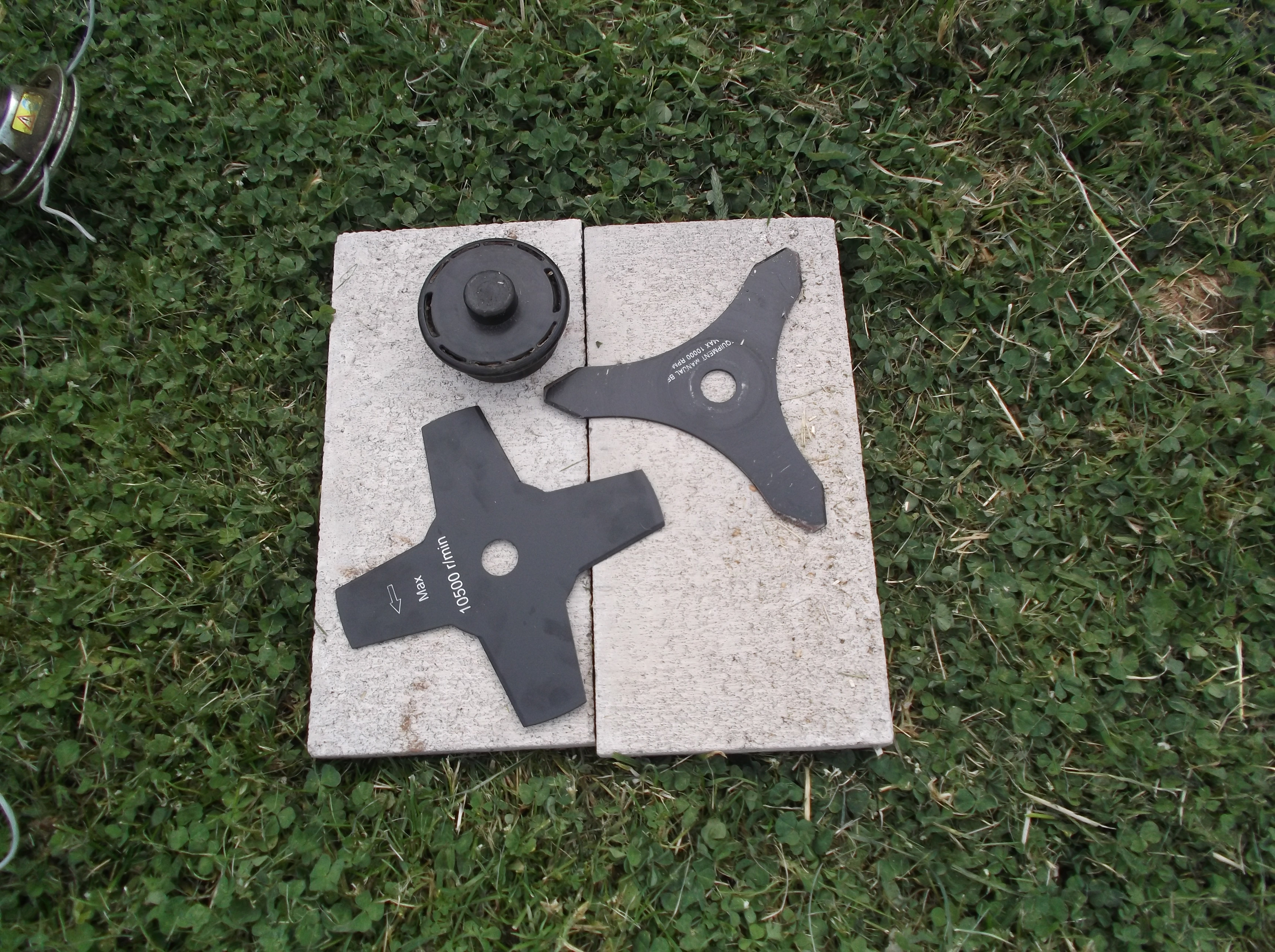
Two brush knives and a bump feed trimmer head (for smaller foliage)

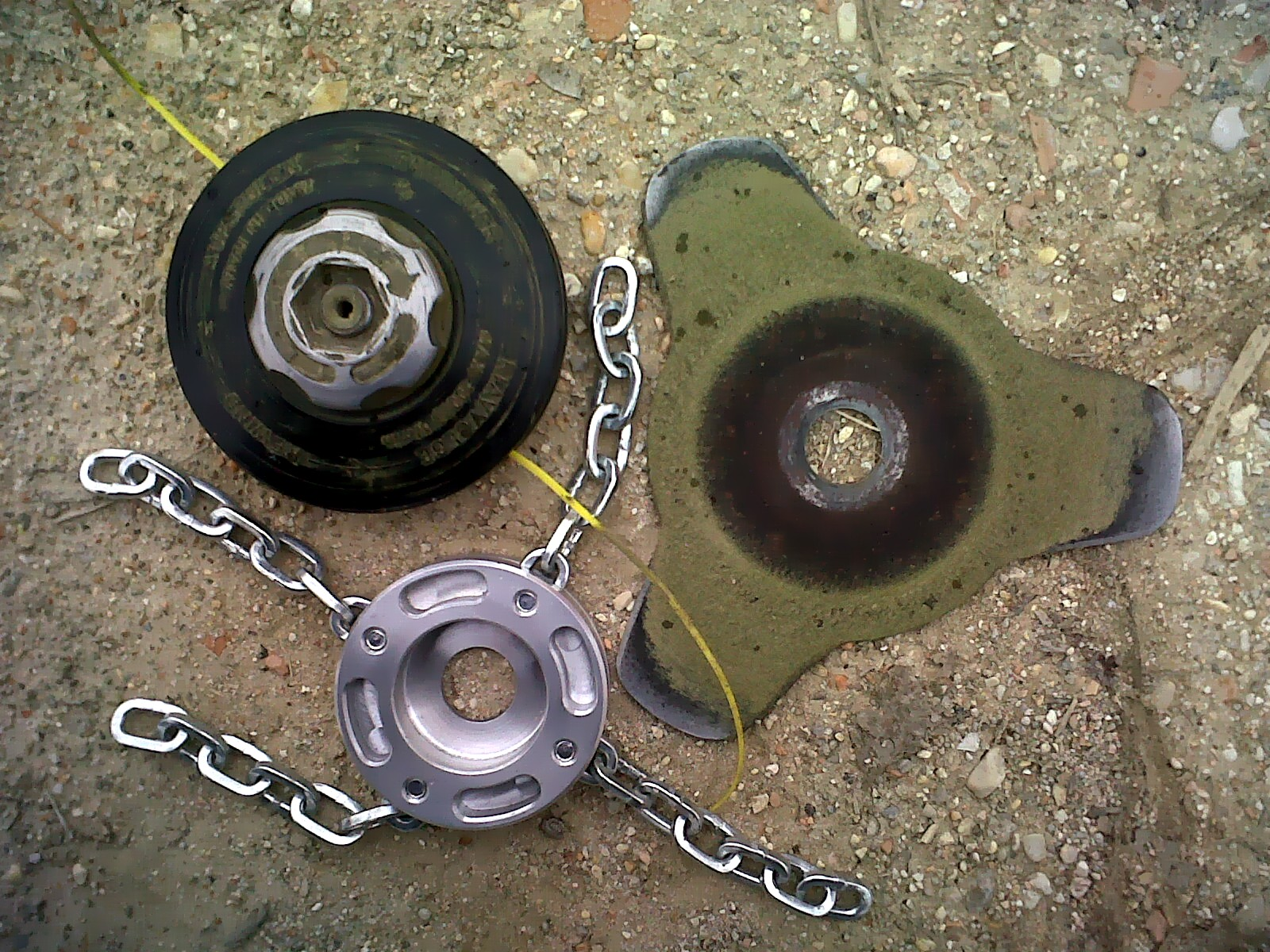
Bump feed trimmer head, brush knife and chain flail

Cutting heads include circular saw blades (chisel tooth or scratcher tooth), brush knives, grass blades, etc. Most brushcutters also allow other heads to be fitted, including bump feed and fixed line heads such as those used on line trimmers or modified saw blades such as a beaver blade which resembles a chainsaw. Deflectors are attached on the cutting side of the machine to prevent injury to the operator from debris thrown by the cutting head.

Plastic or metal flails can be used for cutting stems too large for a line head but not requiring a blade. Following an incident in the UK in which when a metal chain link thrown from an aftermarket flail killed a bystander, all flail heads are now banned in the EU.
