= Liberation cutting =

Liberation cutting has similar goals to liberation thinning and cleaning, namely the allocation of resources to the most promising trees available on a site. What separates liberation cutting from cleaning is that the overtopping competitors are of a distinctly older age class . Need for liberation cutting often occurs when seedlings of a desired species have been regenerated by a logging operation, but that operation has left older, poor quality or undesired trees that are shading the regeneration and limiting its growth.

Liberation cutting may be superficially similar to an overstory removal cutting. The major difference between these is that in the overstory removal, regeneration was deliberate and the best trees were saved for the final harvest. In the liberation cutting, the worst trees remain and regeneration an afterthought to a logging operation.

Harvesting the undesired trees is not a requirement in liberation operations; the poor quality trees may be removed in place and left as snags, or felled and left to contribute coarse woody debris.

== See also ==
- Silviculture
