= Rockwell Tools =

Line of power tools

- Product type: Power tools; Hand tools
- Current owner: Positec Tool Corporation
- Country: USA; China
- Introduced: 2005
- Website: www.rockwelltools.com

Rockwell Tools is a line of power tools that is currently owned and distributed by Positec Tool Corporation, a China-based company with North American headquarters in Charlotte, North Carolina. The brand offers power tools and hand tools that are most often used in professional and private construction, automotive repair, and woodworking. Its products are sold at a variety of retailers including Lowe's, Costco, and The Home Depot.

== History ==
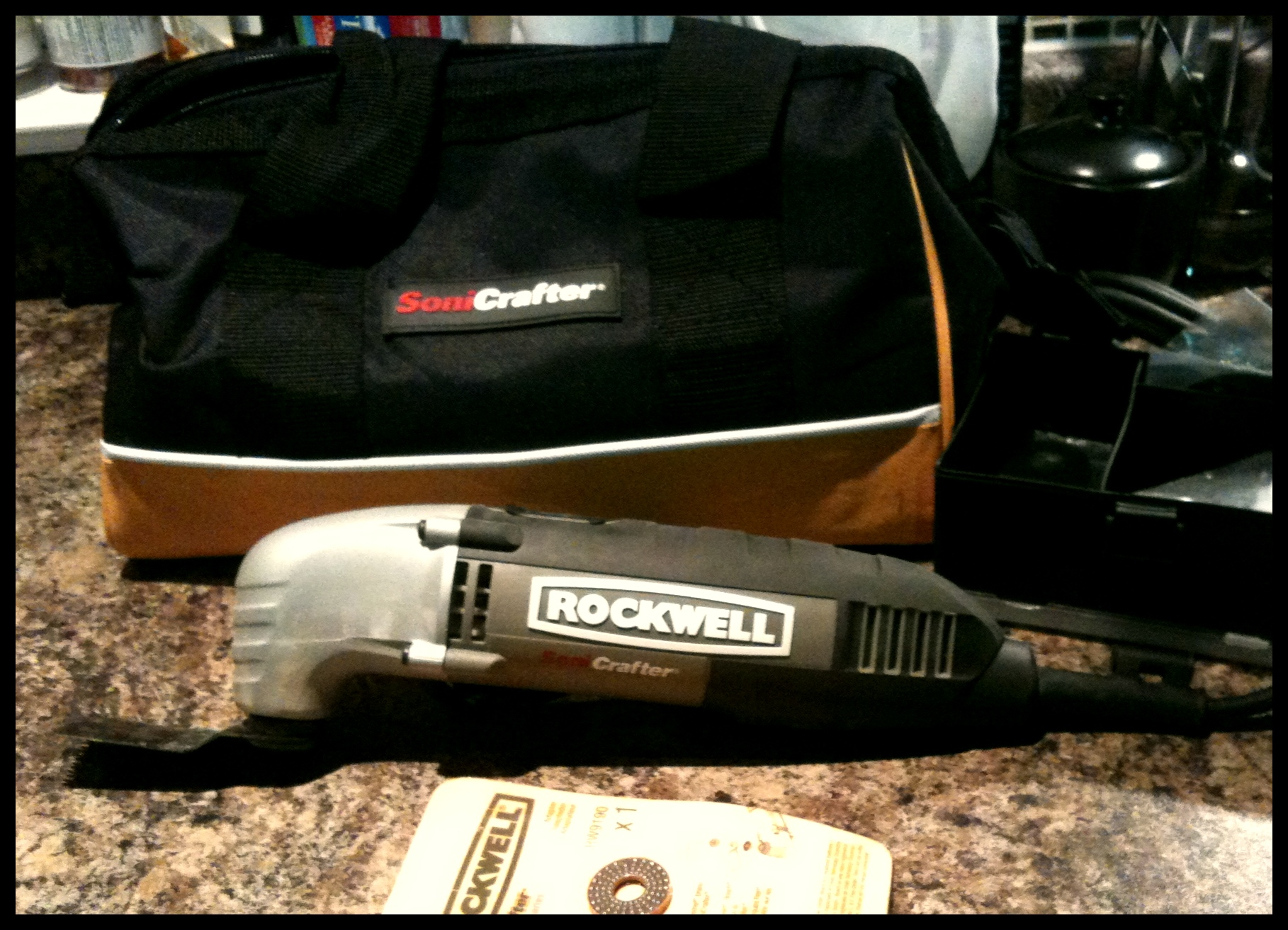
Rockwell SoniCrafter

The Positec Tool Corporation was founded in Suzhou, China, in 1994 by Don Gao. It primarily sold OEM tools to established brands like Black & Decker. In the early 2000s, Gao decided to branch out by manufacturing tools and lawn care accessories under his own brand name. Meanwhile, Tom Duncan, the current CEO of the Positec Tool Corporation in North America, was the vice president of a Robert Bosch GmbH-owned company called Vermont American. He quit that job in 2003 to pursue the manufacture of a line of power tools. He purchased the rights to the brand name "Rockwell" which hadn't been in use for power tools since 1981.

Gao and Duncan met in 2004, with Gao looking to launch the "WORX" brand of lawn care accessories and Duncan looking to manufacture the Rockwell Tools brand. They decided to partner up, and Duncan became the head of the North American division of Positec in 2005. Both the Rockwell Tools and the WORX brands were originally sold directly to consumers via infomercials. Products branded with Rockwell Tools first appeared in the retailer Lowe's, in October 2009. By 2012, the main North American distribution center had moved to Huntersville, North Carolina, from Long Beach, California, to facilitate the increased sales. Rockwell Tools could also be found in Costco and The Home Depot (among other retailers) in 2012.

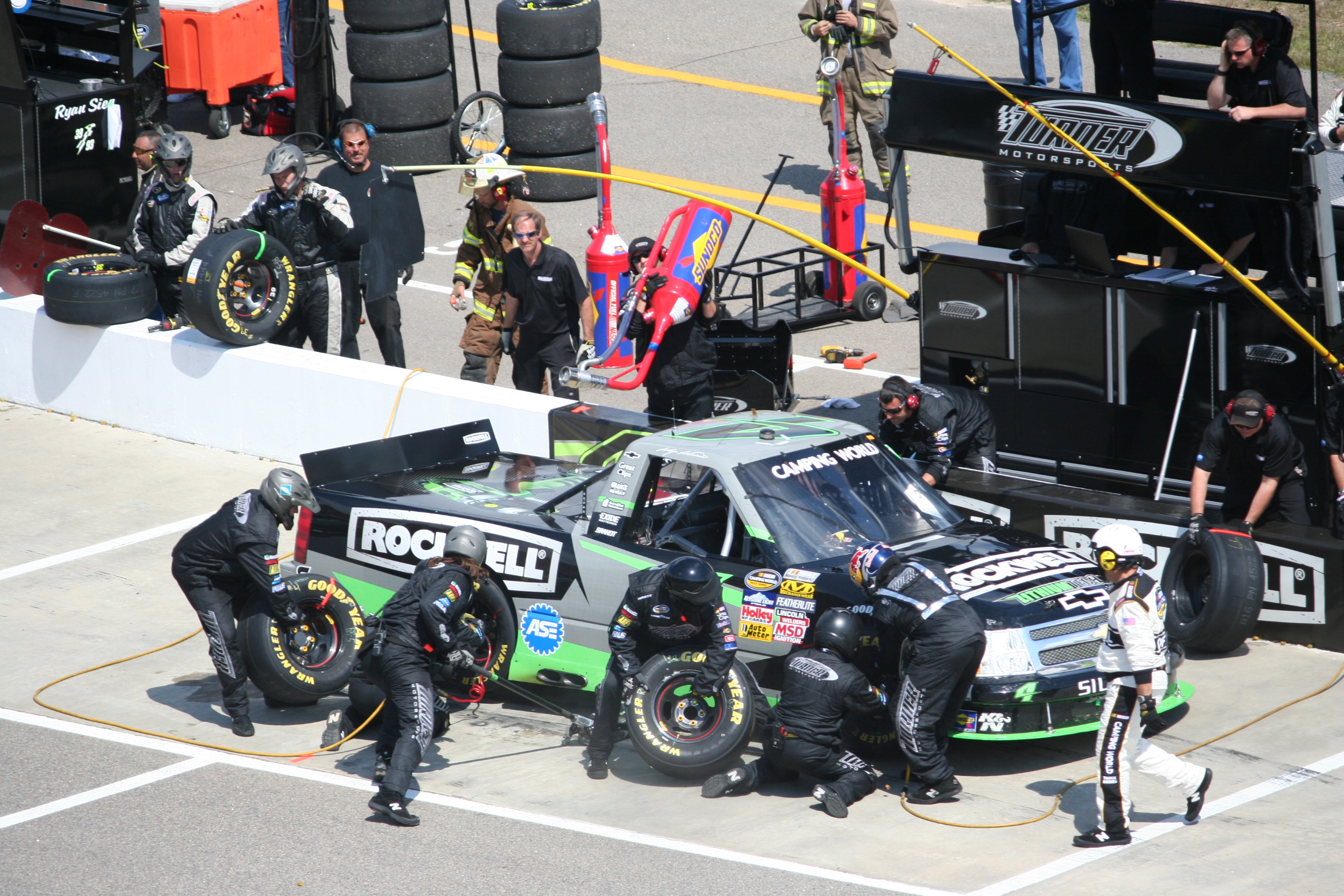
Kasey Kahne driving the #4 truck sponsored by Rockwell Tools at Rockingham Speedway.

In 2012, the Rockwell brand was designated the "Official Power Tool" of Rockingham Speedway in Rockingham, North Carolina. They also served as the sponsor for Kasey Kahne's vehicle in the NASCAR Camping World Truck Series race in Rockingham that year. In 2013, Rockwell Tools was a part of an integrated ad campaign that was featured on both the History Channel and its reality TV series Counting Cars. The campaign's slogan was "Rock Your Garage", which was also the title of a sweepstakes associated with the campaign.

== Products ==
The Rockwell Tools brand features power tools (both corded and cordless) and hand tools. Some of these tools include drills, VersaCut circular saws, power planers, miter saws, G-Force angle grinders, sanders, and bench grinders. Many of the products offered by Rockwell Tools come with free batteries for life. Rockwell Tools also offers a variety of specialty tools including the Sonicrafter, an oscillating multi-tool that is used for remodeling and general home improvement. The Jawhorse is a clamping device that is similar in style to a bench vise, but offers hands-free operation. Rockwell also offers the ShopSeries, which is a line of tools aimed at budget-conscious DIYers.

== Recognition and awards ==
In 2011, Positec was honored with the Product of the Year award by DIY Week in the power tools category for Rockwell's Sonicrafter oscillating tool and the Rockwell G-Force angle grinder.
