= Liberation thinning =

Forestry process

Liberation thinning a process in silviculture for a number of important forestry operations. Liberation thinning is a process mostly used for logging operations but is also used for conservation, reforesting efforts, and fuel reduction or hazard fuel reduction. Usually for logging operations use liberation cutting first then liberation thinning will continue for another 20 – 30 years where every 10 years thinning is conducted. But the research with liberation thinning was used for young secondary forest around 4.5 years old to see the effects with DBH on younger tree where competition is the most prevalent.

== Logging Operations ==
Liberation thinning is used to reduce competition between trees grown for harvesting to increase the DBH of young, juvenile, and mature trees, logging operations will choose the best tree for harvest comparing height, straightness of trunk, live canopy, disease, and DBH, to predict the growth outcome and reduce competition for cultural benefits like water and sunlight. This was done in Northern Costa Rica where protected forest and Agriculture land are tightly packed together limiting land for logging operations.

== Conservation/reforesting efforts ==
Conservation is another way liberation thinning is helping our environment as reforestation in tropical areas struggle to achieve success due to the number of canopy layers needed. Conservation research used liberation thinning as a way to grow the best emergent layer, canopy layer, understory layer and finally forest floor.
