= Edger =

Tool used to trim the edges of a lawn

An edge trimmer or lawn edger is a garden tool, either manual or motorised, to form distinct boundaries between a lawn, typically consisting of a grass, or other soft botanical ground cover, and another ground surface feature such as a paved, concreted or asphalted area, or a granular material such as sand or gravel, or simply uncovered soil, for example an unbounded garden.

There are six main types of lawn edger:

- Manual
  - Spade-based
  - Roller-based
  - Hand shears
- Motorised
  - Adaptable string trimmer
  - Single-wheel purpose-designed
  - Multi-wheel purpose-designed

Purpose-designed lawn edgers are more time efficient for long and even edges, while string trimmers are more efficient for angular edges and around interrupting features such as rocks. Spade-based, roller-based, and adaptable string trimmer designs may all be known as stick trimmers.

Typical situations for the use of lawn edgers are to define clean boundaries, and stop grass incursion, between lawns and walkways or gardens in private properties and public areas, and between sand traps and greens or fairways on golf courses.

== Manual lawn edgers ==
=== Spade-based ===
The simplest lawn edger is the standard spade, used as a vertical cutting blade.

Purpose-designed manual spade-based lawn edgers are a half-moon-shaped, semicircular, broad blade attached to an elongated handle, and are used in a downwards and rocking motion. The blade may have a flat top to allow the operator to step on the blade to apply more force. The blade is driven through the lawn and into the lawn substrate parallel to (and adjacent to) the hard boundary feature bordering the lawn, cutting any protruding lawn material. This type of lawn edger is also known as an edging iron.

=== Roller-based ===
There are two basic types of roller based manual lawn edgers. Both are driven by pushing a roller wheel along a hard surface adjacent to the lawn edge. One type causes a solid steel cutting disc to cut the edge of the lawn; the other type causes two star-spoked discs to rotate against each other, shear-cutting the edge of the lawn.

=== Hand shears ===
Hand shears come in many configurations, ranging from single hand operated at ground level to long handled, some with adjustable length, operated by two hands, with a right angle alignment of the shearing blades allowing lateral cutting from a standing position.

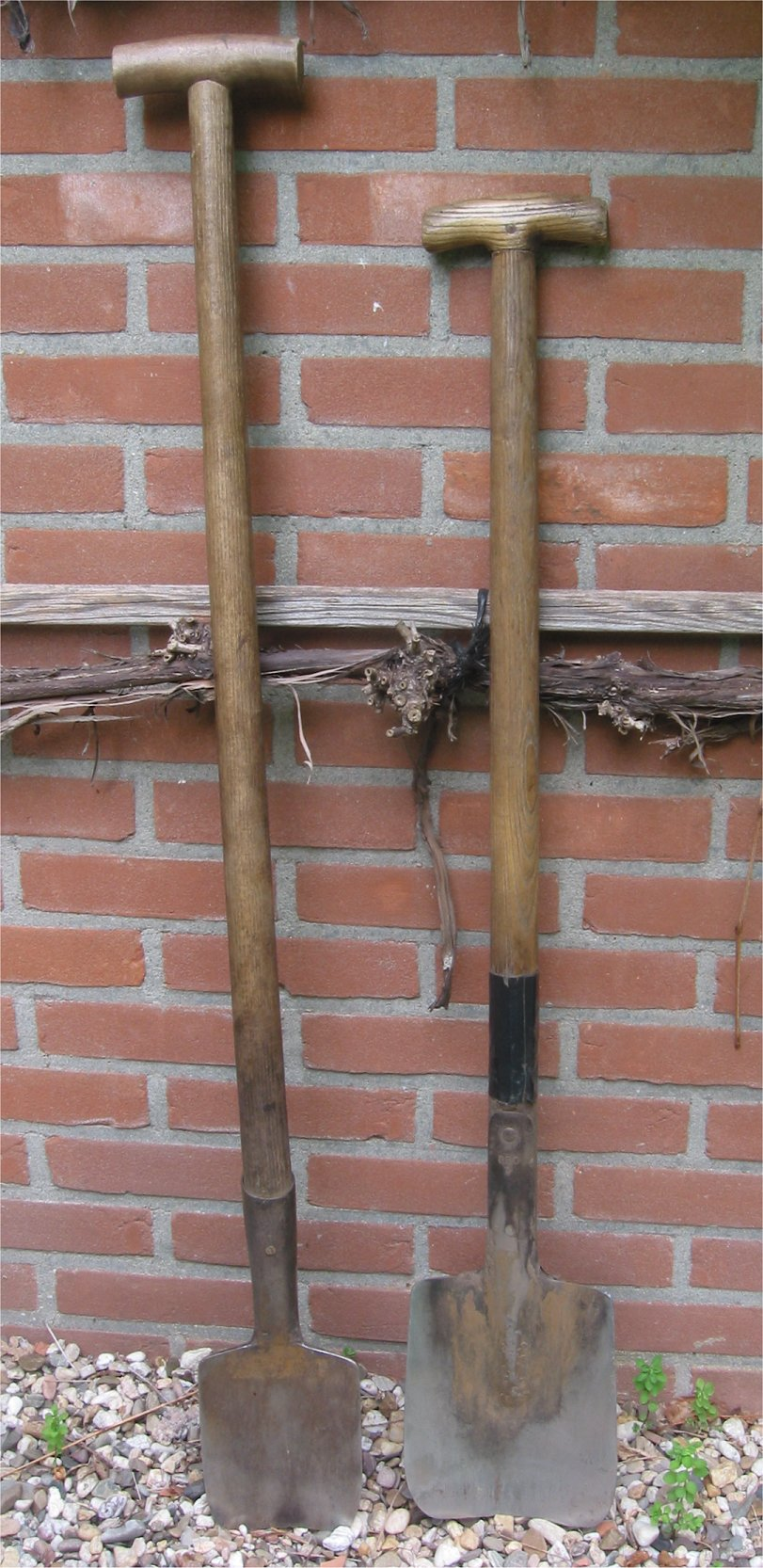
Two typical spades

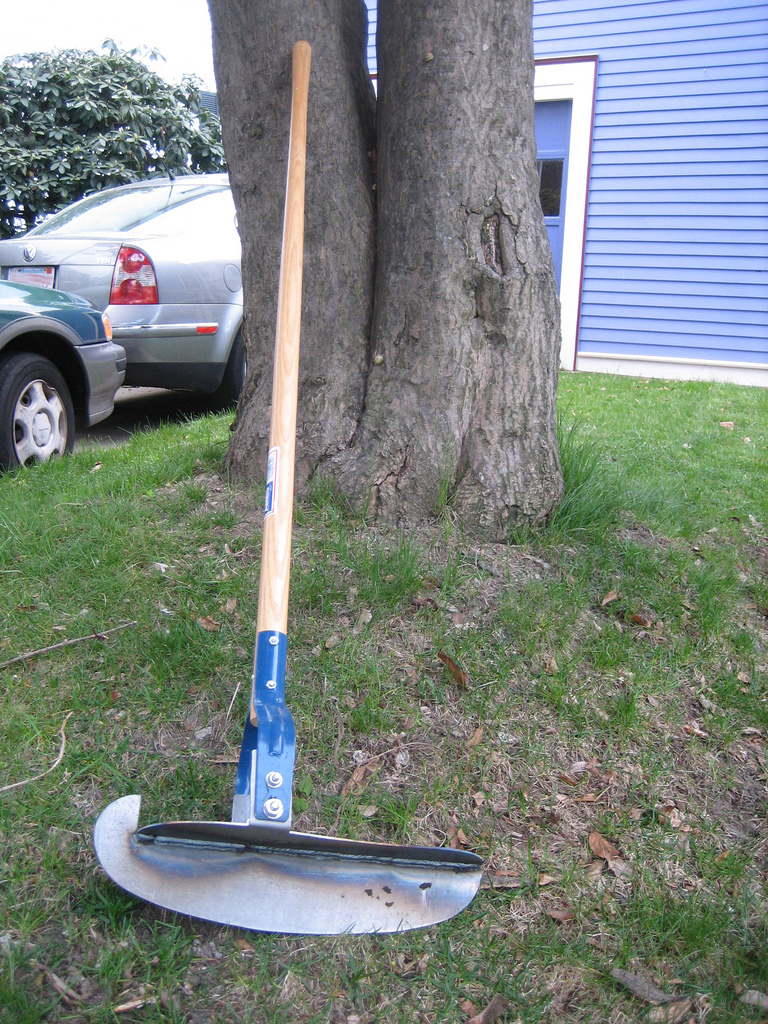
A (half moon) lawn edger

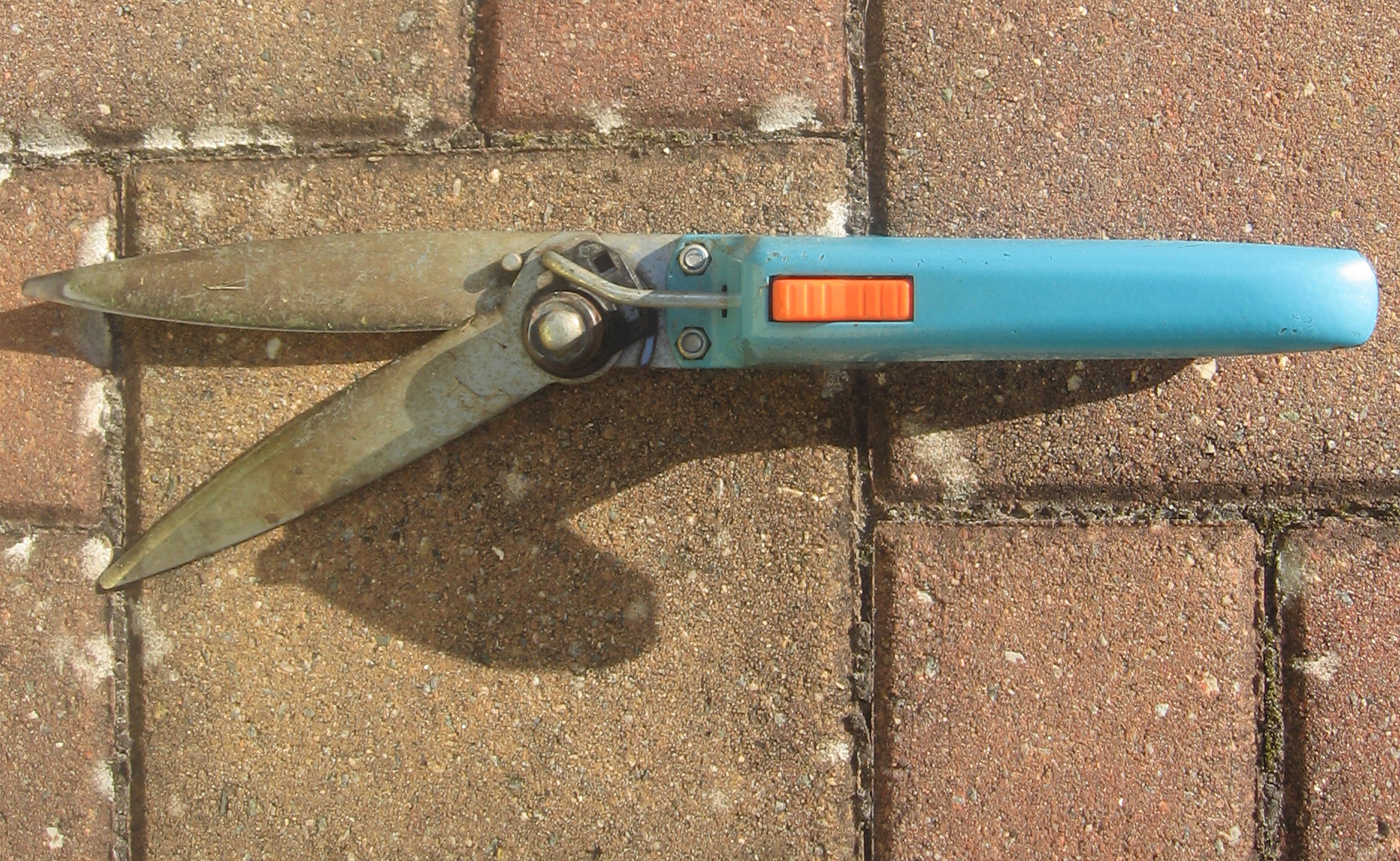
Edging hand shears

== Motorised lawn edgers ==
Powering motorised lawn edgers can be either by battery or mains electricity, or by petrol two stroke or four stroke engines.

=== Adaptable string trimmers ===
Some string trimmers are designed so that they can be easily maneuvered with their head being positioned vertically instead of the default horizontal. Other string trimmers come with specific lawn edging attachments, or the one head can be pivoted to be realigned vertically.

Lawn edging with a string trimmer will often be done with a blade fitted to the head rather than string/wire.

=== Purpose designed lawn edgers ===
Purpose designed lawn edgers are single-purpose machines for greater lawn edging distances.

Single-wheel designs are lighter and more maneuverable than multi-wheel designs which are built for heavy duty work.

Some designs allow the angle at which the cutting chord or blade or blades strike the lawn edge to be adjusted.

== History ==
The gasoline lawn edger was invented by Louis Faas Sr. of King o' Lawn Inc. in the 1940s. The first gasoline edgers used a Briggs & Stratton 1.5 horsepower (1.1 kW) engine.

== See also ==
- String trimmer (line cutter, brush cutter, whipper snipper)
