= Leaf blower =

Machine used to blow leaves and debris

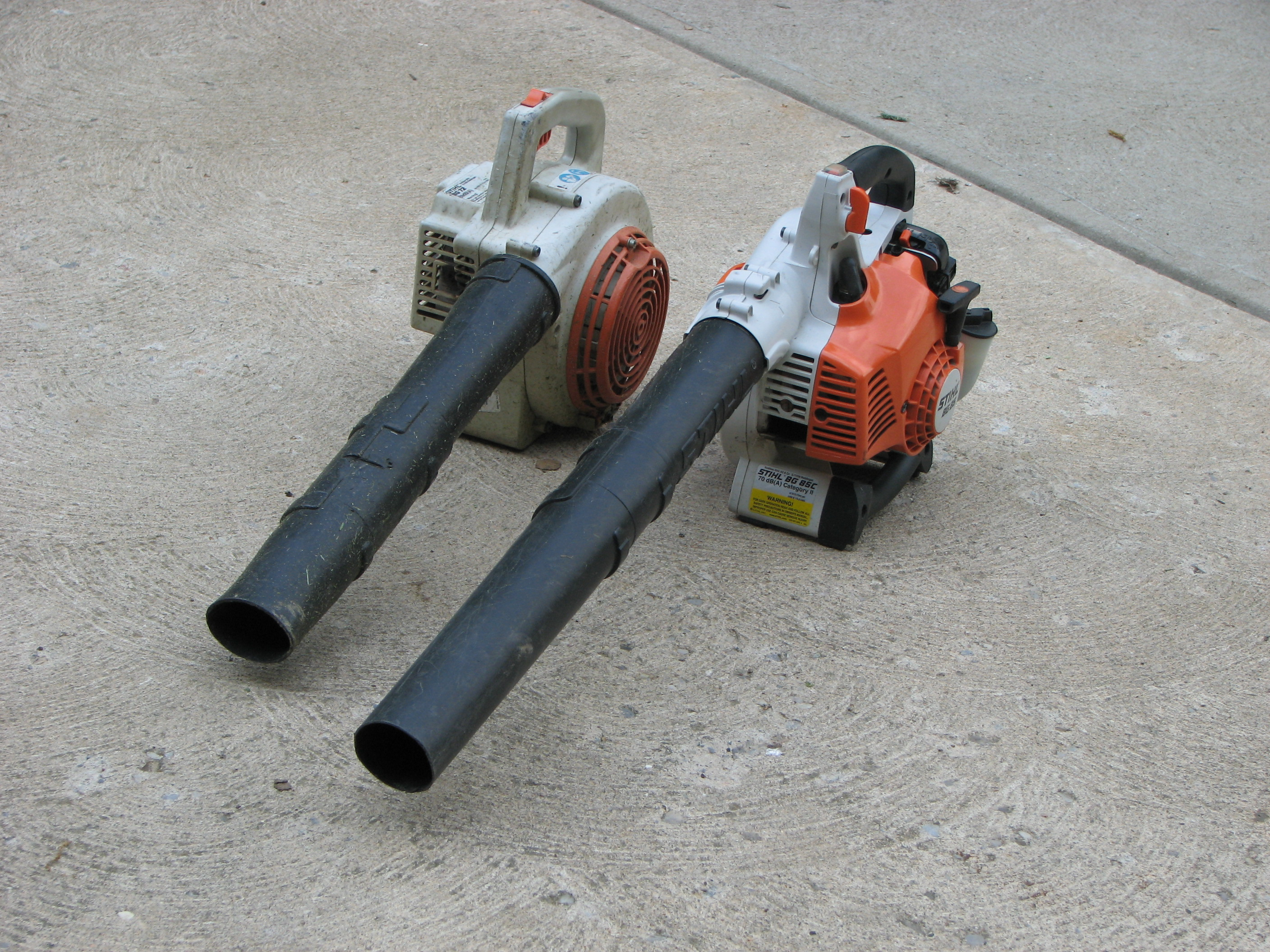
Blowers

A leaf blower, commonly known as a blower, is a device that propels air out of a nozzle to move debris such as leaves and grass cuttings. Leaf blowers are powered by electric or gasoline motors. Gasoline models have traditionally been two-stroke engines, but four-stroke engines were recently introduced to partially address air pollution concerns. Leaf blowers are typically self-contained handheld units, or backpack mounted units with a handheld wand. The latter is more ergonomic for prolonged use. Larger units may rest on wheels and even use a motor for propulsion. These are sometimes called "walk-behind leaf blowers" because they must be pushed by hand to be operated. Some units called blower vacs, can also suck in leaves and small twigs via a vacuum cleaner-like mechanism into a bag.

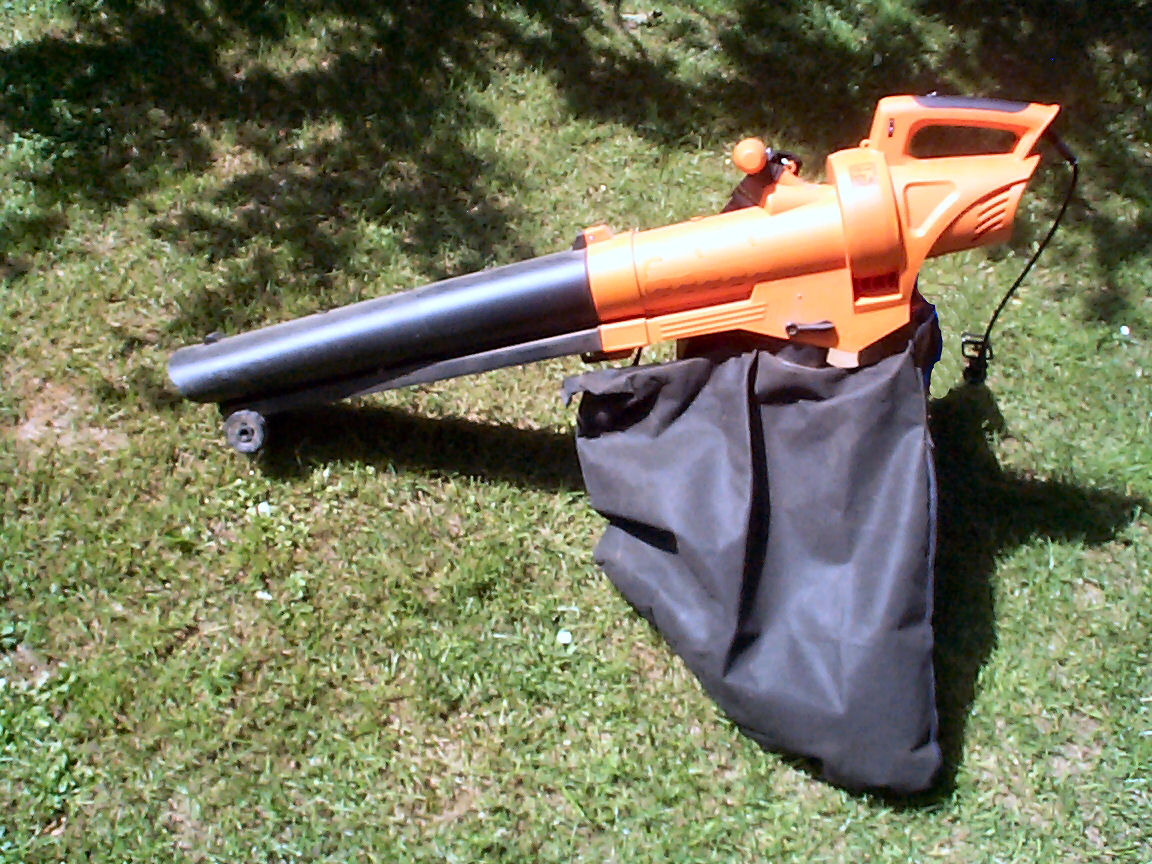
Blower vac

Leaf blowers are a source of controversy due to their adverse impacts such as operator injury, including hearing loss, air pollution, noise pollution, and ecological habitat destruction. Over 200 localities have restricted the use of leaf blowers and many major cities, including Washington, DC, are implementing total bans due to the negative effects to operator health, ecological destruction, pollution, and nuisances including noise. October 9, 2021, California passed an air pollution control law AB1346 phasing out small off-road engines, like those found in leaf blowers, set to take effect January 1, 2024.

== Environmental and occupational risks ==
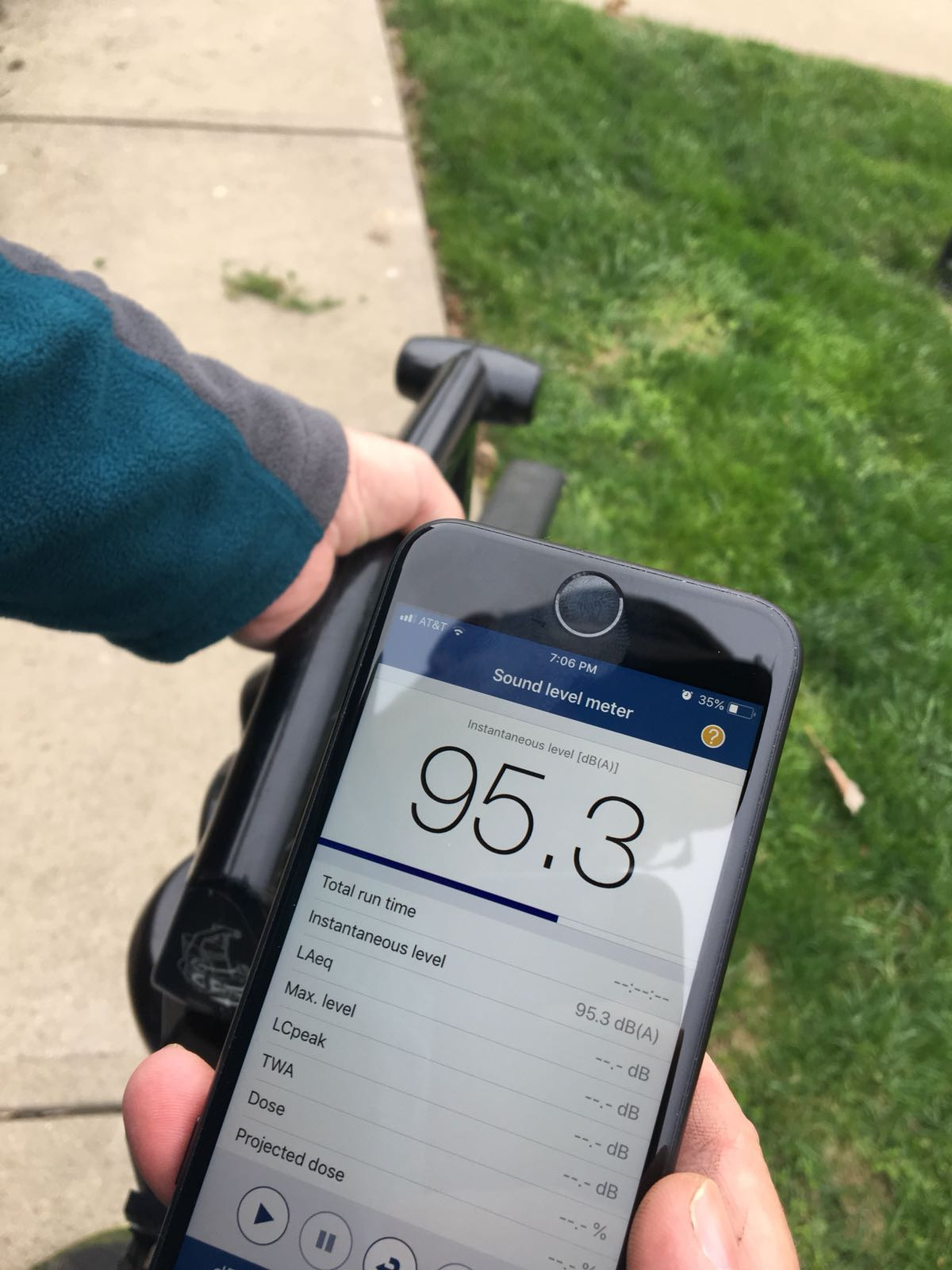
Noise level of a gas-powered leaf blower using the NIOSH Sound Level Meter app

Emissions from gasoline-powered grounds-keeping equipment in general are a source of air pollution and more immediately, noise pollution. In the United States, US emission standards prescribe maximum emissions from small engines. The two-stroke engines used in most leaf blowers operate by mixing gasoline with oil, and a third of this mixture is not burned, but is emitted as an aerosol exhaust. These pollutants have been linked to cancer, heart disease, and asthma. A 2011 study found that the amount of NMHC pollutants emitted by a leaf blower operated for 30 minutes is comparable to the amount emitted by a Ford F-150 pickup truck driving from Texas to Alaska.

In addition to the adverse health effects of carbon monoxide, nitrogen oxides, hydrocarbons, and particulates generated in the exhaust gas of the gasoline-powered engines, leaf blowers pose problems related to the dust raised by the powerful flow of air. Dust clouds caused by leaf blowers contain potentially harmful substances such as pesticide residues and pathogens.

Noise pollution is also a concern with leaf blowers, as they can emit noise levels above those required to cause hearing loss to both the operator and those nearby.

Leaf blowers also present an occupational hearing loss risk to the nearly 1 million people who work in lawn service and ground-keeping. A recent study assessed the occupational noise exposure among groundskeepers at several North Carolina public universities and found noise levels from leaf blowers averaging 89 decibels (A-weighted) and maximum sound pressure levels reaching 106 dB(A), both far exceeding the National Institute for Occupational Safety and Health (NIOSH) Recommended Exposure Limit of 85 dB(A)

Leaves are ecologically beneficial, providing habitat for insects and microorganisms and nutrients for the soil. Leaving some leaves rather than removing them all can support biodiversity.

Battery-powered leaf blowers produce zero emissions, are more efficient, and are even rechargeable, making them an increasingly reliable alternative to gas power.

=== Bans ===
Soon after the leaf blower was introduced into the U.S., its use was banned in two California cities, Carmel-by-the-Sea in 1975 and Beverly Hills in 1978, as a noise nuisance. There are currently twenty California cities that have banned leaf blowers, sometimes only within residential neighborhoods and usually targeting gasoline-powered equipment. Another 80 cities have ordinances on the books restricting either usage or noise level or both.

Washington, DC banned gas-power leaf blowers in 2018. A law banning the sale of gas-powered lawn equipment in California took effect in 2024. Cambridge, Massachusetts banned them in 2025. Portland, Oregon will ban gas-powered leaf blowers in 2028, with a phase-out period that started in 2026.

As of 2025, according to the CoPIRG Foundation, a Colorado-based consumer watchdog, over 160 US-cities ban petrol-powered leaf blowers.

== See also ==
- String trimmer
