= DIY Week =

British magazine

- Editor: Neil Meed
- Former editors: Colin Petty
- Staff writers: James Meed (Assist Editor)
- Frequency: Monthly magazine
- Circulation: 7,000 (disputed)
- Publisher: Datateam Business Media Ltd
- First issue: Founded in 1874, running for 150–151 years under various titles
- Based in: Maidstone, Kent
- Language: English
- Website: www.diyweek.net

DIY Week is a British fortnightly business-to-business magazine for those in the do it yourself (DIY), household hardware and homeware market. The magazine is published by Datateam in Maidstone, Kent, in England.

Founded in 1874, DIY Week is sold to retailers of hardware, housewares, garden and DIY products, and their suppliers, and contains news, comment, financial analysis and market trend information.

== History ==
Originally launched by a Birmingham hardware wholesaler as Martineau & Smith's Monthly Circular, the magazine was very soon renamed Hardware Trade Journal, and changed from monthly to weekly publication in 1900. Over the following decades it became the major business magazine for its market, absorbing its main competitor, The Ironmonger, as well as many small titles. It was renamed DIY Week in 1988, reflecting the rise of the DIY market, and switched to fortnightly frequency in 1991.

Following a period of ownership by Faversham House Group's now defunct media division going back to at least 2005, and published most notably during this period by Colin Petty, DIY Week sat alongside various other titles in the Faversham portfolio. These included Hardware & Garden Review, Housewares Focus, Housewares Magazine and Builders Merchants Journal as well as other titles in the wider durables sector. During this period Hardware & Garden Review was incorporated on a quarterly basis within the magazine.

Datateam acquired the magazine in 2013, and periodically reduced the volume of content produced and while maintaining or increasing the magazines length. The earliest digital record on the website from January 2017 displays 13 pages of non-advertising content out of 30 pages, in a bi weekly magazine. During the COVID-19 pandemic it switched to a monthly frequency, not reverting subsequently. The January 2023 magazine, now a monthly document, contains 9 pages of news content excluding 2 pages of promotion for its own awards out of 36 pages of print run. It has also not produced Hardware & Garden Review as an internal supplement for multiple years.

While its distribution figures are no longer published, it maintains a media pack available via its website claiming a distribution of 7000. However these numbers listed have remained exactly fixed for a minimum of five years and these are therefore subject to query.
