= String trimmer =

Garden tool for trimming grass

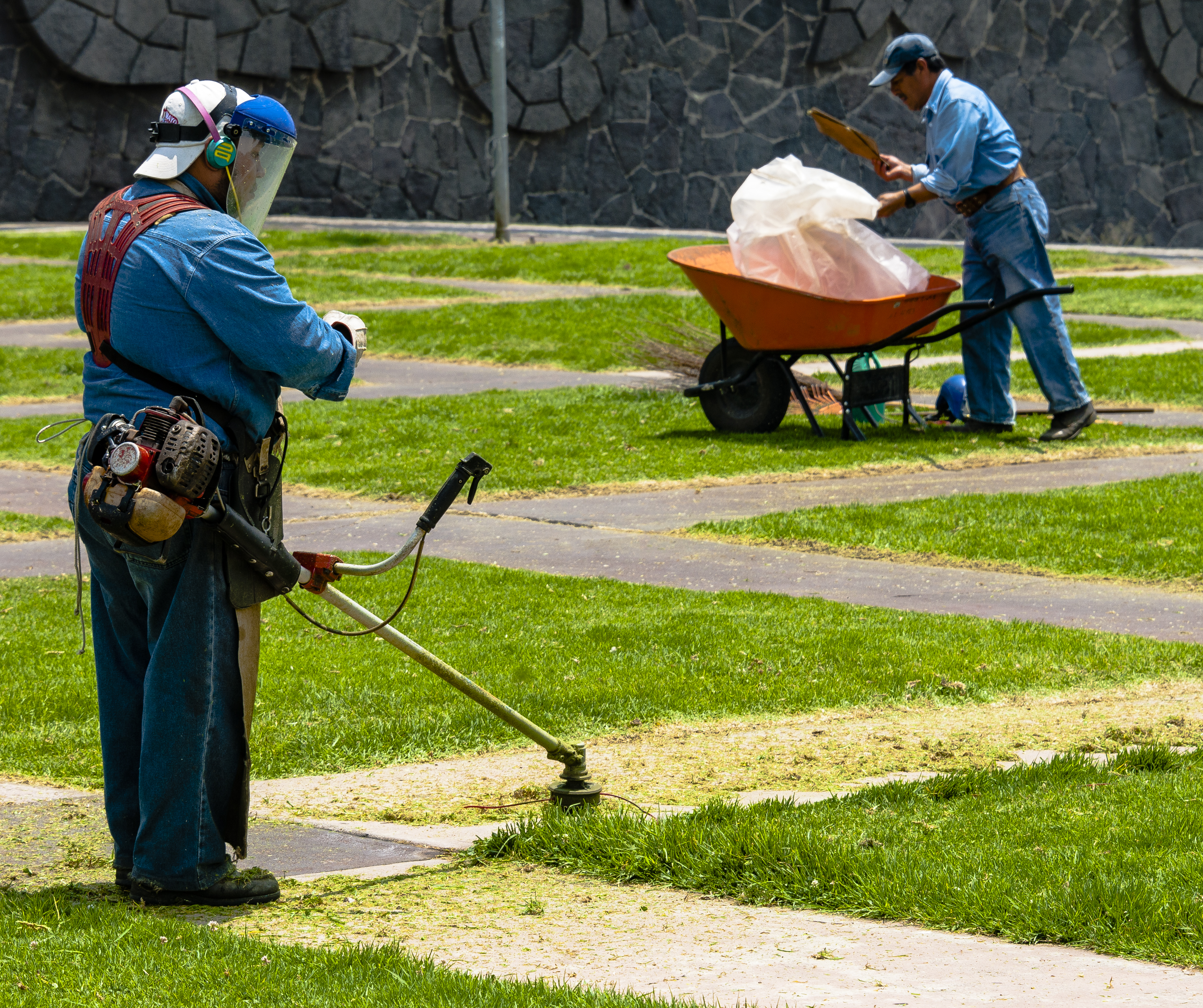
A man using a gasoline-powered string trimmer

A string trimmer, also known as a line trimmer and by the trademarks Strimmer, Weedwacker, Weed Eater and Whipper Snipper, is a garden power tool for cutting grass, small weeds, and groundcover. Instead of a blade, it uses a whirling monofilament line which protrudes from a rotating spindle at the end of a long shaft topped by a gasoline engine or electric motor.

String trimmers are commonly used for cutting low foliage near obstacles or on steep or irregular terrain. Most professional-grade line trimmers take brush cutter attachments for denser vegetation.

== History ==
The string trimmer was invented in the early 1970s by George Ballas of Houston, Texas, who conceived the idea while watching the revolving action of the cleaning brushes in an automatic car wash. His first trimmer was made by attaching pieces of heavy-duty fishing line to a tin can bolted to an edger. Ballas developed this into what he called the "Weed Eater", since it chewed up the grass and weeds around trees. Originally produced by Houston-based Weed Eaters, Inc., who registered the trademark in 1972, the business changed hands several times and is now owned by Husqvarna.

Corded electric and petrol-engined competitors arrived in the mid '70s, establishing registered trade names such as Whipper Snipper (Black+Decker Canada, 1976), Weedwacker (Sears Roebuck, USA 1978, but first use claimed in 1975) and Strimmer (Black+Decker UK 1977); which like the original Weed Eater have been subsequently used as the generic term for any string trimmer in different regions. From Strimmer has been backformed the colloquial verb "to strim".

== Design ==
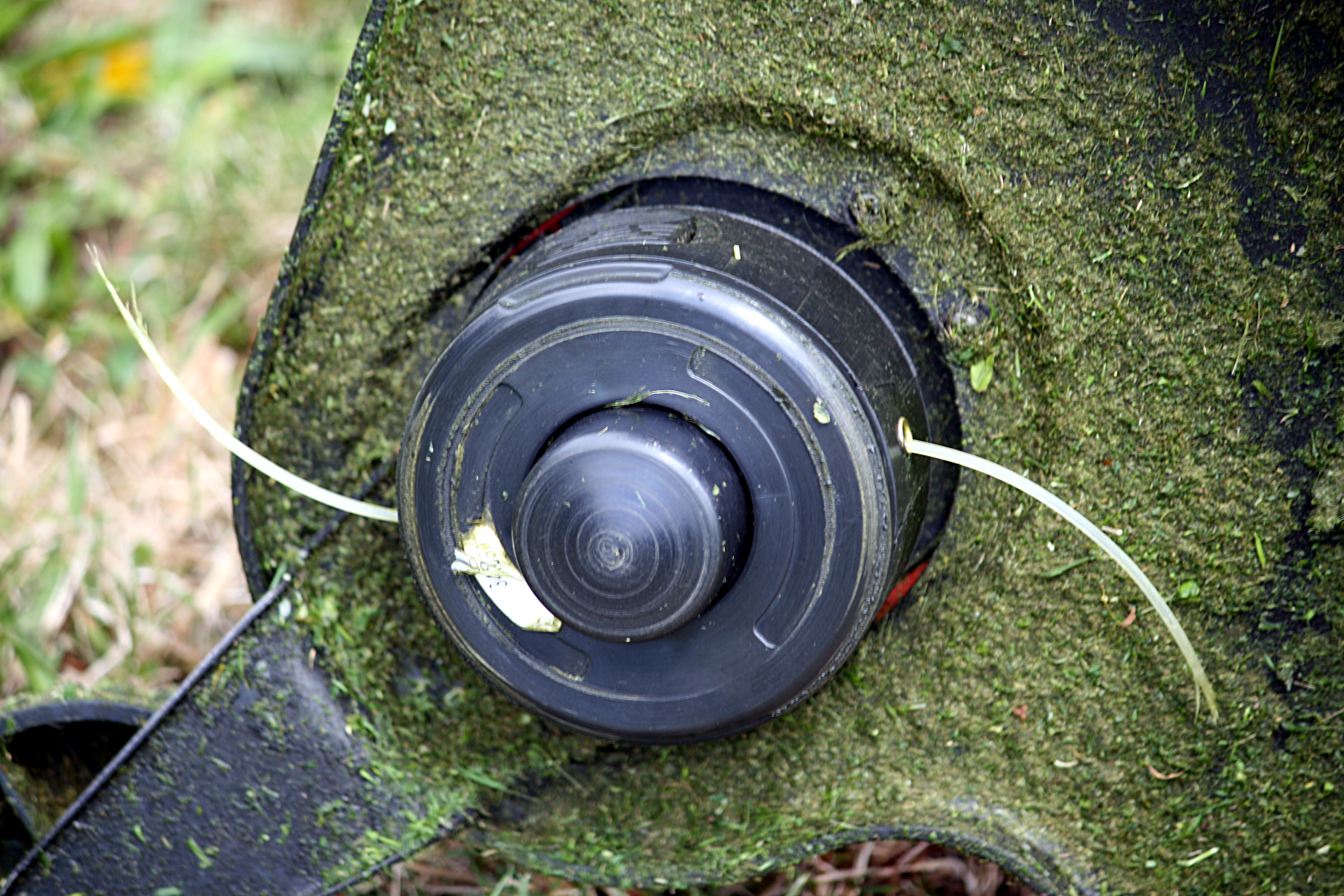
A bump feed style string trimmer head

A string trimmer works on the principle that a line spun fast enough on its center stiffens by centrifugal force; the faster the hub turns, the more rigid the line. Even round-section nylon line is able to cut grass and slight, woody plants quite well. Some monofilament lines designed for more powerful cutters have an extruded shape, like a star, that helps the line slash the material being cut; the line is thus able to cut quite large woody plants (small shrubs) or at least girdle them effectively. These lines make solid disks less necessary for tough jobs.

The line is hand-wound onto a reel before the job is started, leaving both ends extending from the reel housing. The motor turns the reel and the line extends horizontally while the operator swings the trimmer about where the plants are to be trimmed. The operator controls the height at which cutting takes place and can trim down to ground level quite easily.

As the line is worn—or breaks off—a bump feed string trimmer, the operator knocks the reel on the ground so a release mechanism allows some of the line in the reel to replace the spent portion. Newer models "auto-feed", where a small cutter ensures the exposed length does not exceed what can be swung effectively. Newly extended line operates more effectively because of its heavier weight and surface effects. The speed of the spinning hub is controlled by a trigger-activated throttle on the handle.

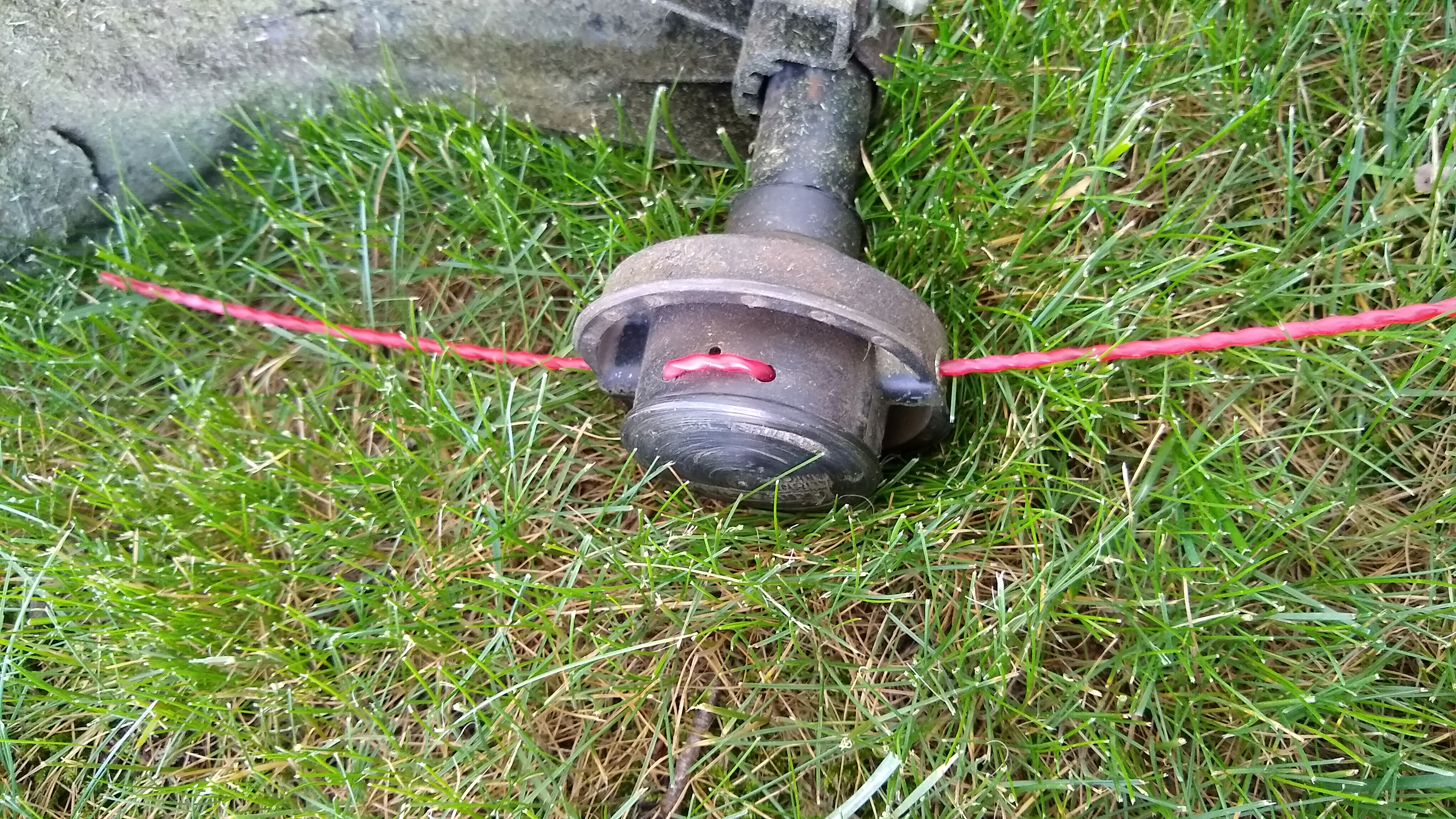
A fixed line style string trimmer head

A fixed-line string trimmer has a trimmer head that takes pre-cut line inserts. There is no wound spool of line in the trimmer head; the user instead feeds the pre-cut line in to the appropriate slots, making the trimmer easier to feed line into and troubleshoot than a bump feed system.

For vertical cutting the whole machine can be tilted or some trimmers allow the head to be adjusted at different angles.

String trimmers powered by an internal combustion engine have the engine on the opposite end of the shaft from the cutting head, while electric string trimmers typically have an electric motor in the cutting head, but there are other arrangements, such as where the trimmer is connected to heavy machinery and powered by a hydraulic motor.

The head contains a safety shield on the user side and a rotating hub which may also be called a head or spool. Disadvantages of a gasoline-powered string trimmer include its greater weight, the need to refuel, and the significant vibration that carries throughout the device, both of which interfere with its maneuverability and contribute to muscle fatigue. Advantages include complete mobility and higher maximum power.

Large trimmers, used for cutting thick roadside grass and weeds in large areas, are both heavier and more powerful. Some are fitted with a harness to spread weight onto the shoulders. Often referred to as brush cutters, these often mount straight or circular metal blades instead of monofilament line.

== Accessories ==
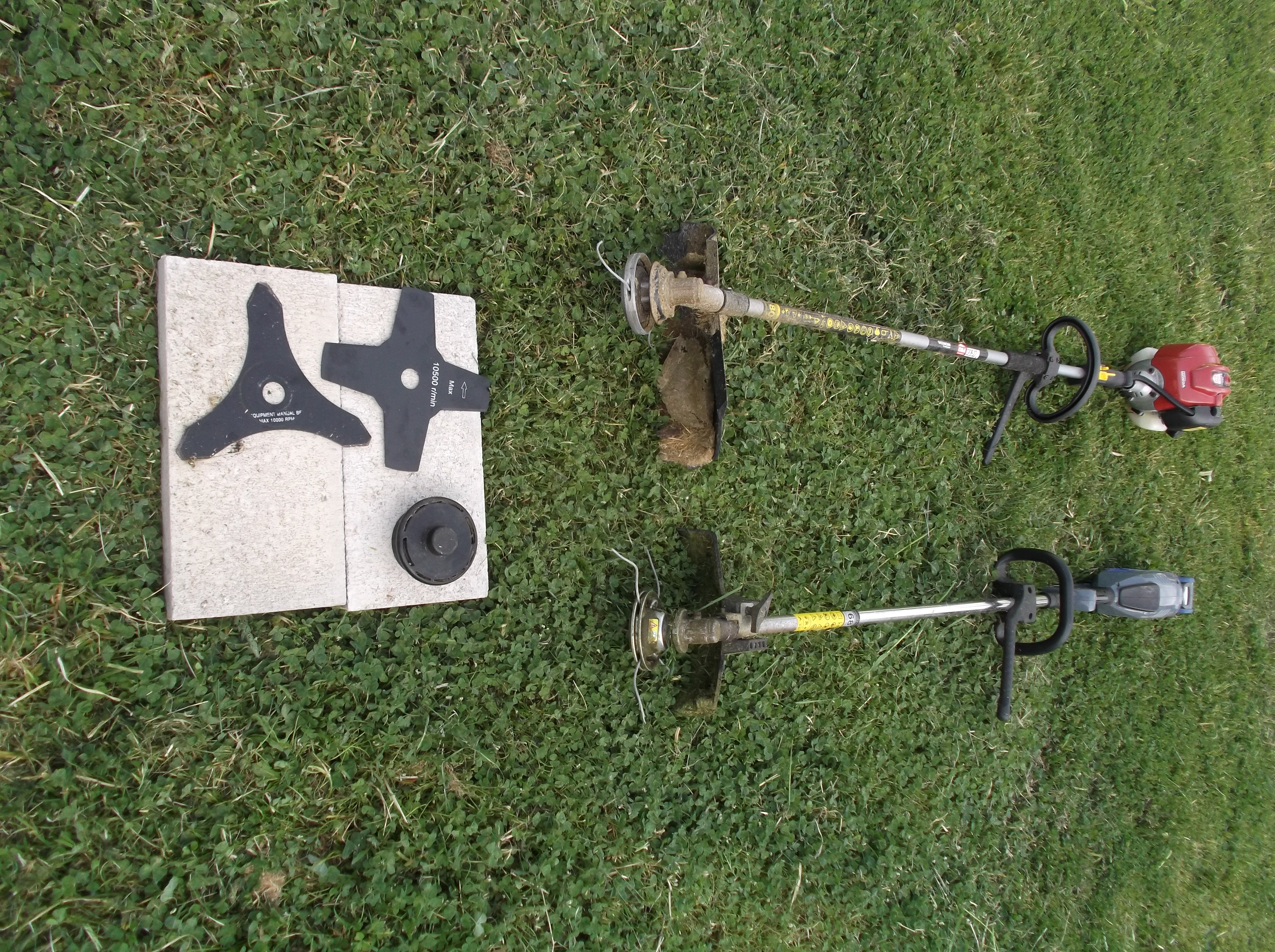
Alternative cutting tools

Many string trimmers allow the hub, the head or the lower part of the shaft to be replaced with accessories. Common accessories include:

- metal or plastic blades
- a small chainsaw
- a toothed hedge trimmer
- a cultivator

Quick-release shafts are offered on many newer models which do not require any tools to switch in accessories.

== Power and emissions ==
A man using a string trimmer in Saitama, Japan

Gasoline-engine powered trimmers usually have a minimum of 21 cc (21 cm^{3}; 1.3 cu in) displacement motors. At this size, they can easily turn 2-millimetre (0.079 in) line, and some have nylon blades as accessories to the line-reel. A 32 cc (32 cm^{3}; 2.0 cu in) engine can swing a 2.75 mm (0.108 in) line and often has metal-blade accessories. Most trimmers use single-cylinder engines (particularly two-stroke) and require gasoline mixed with oil. Due to pollution laws four stroke engines are becoming more popular, particularly in the commercial market. Manufacturers include Honda, MTD and Craftsman. Companies such as John Deere carry low-emission two-stroke engine trimmers. Stihl manufactures a hybrid four-stroke engine trimmer that still requires oil to be pre-mixed into the fuel.

Electrically powered string trimmers produce zero emissions at the point of use, are more efficient, and eliminate risks from spilled gasoline. However, they are typically less powerful and robust than gasoline-powered units; normally they are limited to 2.5 mm (0.098 in) maximum diameter nylon because of their lower power output (400 to about 1200 watts). Gas-powered string trimmers are not regulated to have emission-capturing technology in the USA.

Mains-powered string trimmers have the advantage of being very light, easy to maneuver and easy-to-operate. However, both the power cord and total cord length limit them. Recharge time for a battery model using small or large sealed lead acid, nickel metal hydride, or lithium-ion batteries is typically several hours; some models offer a quick-charge option of as little as half an hour, or a removable battery pack.

Propane-powered string trimmers were also manufactured by Lehr.

== Plastic pollution ==
Earth Island Journal criticised string trimmers as a source of plastic pollution due to the string being shredded while in use.

== Safety concerns ==
String trimmers can send debris flying randomly at high speed. It is typical for the user to wear either safety glasses or a suitable visor to protect their eyes, but passersby are still at risk. The debris can even damage cars and buildings, with a particularly high risk of broken glass.

Chain-link flail rotors, and any other trimmer head with linked metal parts, were prohibited from sale in the EU after a fatal accident in 2010.

== See also ==
- Brushcutter (garden tool), a heavy-duty tool which may take a line trimmer head or various other blades
- Leaf blower
