= Jointing sand =

Type of sand used in construction

Jointing sand is a type of sand, sometimes mixed with a binder, formulated for use in joints between pavers or flagstones. It fills the void between the stones so that water does not flow as easily through the joint and thus provides stability that counteracts displacement over time, as well as inhibiting the growth of grass and weeds (for example, moss).

Weed control can be achieved in several ways with different types of jointing sand and strategies. Weeds do not usually come from below, but start growing by seeds getting into cracks in the joints. Jointing sand works by covering the top of the joints and thus providing poor attachment opportunities for seeds. Precipitation can cause the top part of the grout to run off, requiring refilling. Alternatively, it may be possible to use grout or agents with a high pH, i.e. alkaline, to prevent plants from thriving between the paving stones.

== Technical ==
Jointing sand consists of angular stone grains that pack tightly together, interlock, and form a dense structure that weeds cannot penetrate. Jointing sand is available in varieties ranging from fine, which is easier to work with, to coarse, which can hold in place better, and has a grain size of 0–4 mm. One supplier recommends a maximum joint width of 3 mm for paving stones and flagstones, and that regular grouting sand has sizes of 0–2 mm.

Beach sand, on the other hand, is not suitable as jointng sand, since it consists of round grains of sand that do not lock together, allowing water and plant roots to more easily penetrate.

== Laying ==
A common method for laying jointing sand is to sweep it over the joints of newly laid stones. To get the sand to settle into the joints, a plate compactor can be handy. The process is repeated several times to get a good result.

== Maintenance ==
During the first six months after the stones are laid, it is beneficial to refill the joint sand a couple of times to ensure that the joints are properly filled.

It may also be necessary to replenish jointing sand occasionally later, especially after heavy rains or snowmelt.

== Variants and alternatives ==
There are also polymeric jointing sands or hardening jointing sands that contain a binder that hardens after being watered, so that the jointing sand will not run away as easily after it has been laid. The binder should still be slightly plastic so that it does not crack when frost occurs.

Another option for filling the joints is rock flour, which can also be used under paving stones. It is difficult to work with in the joints, but can produce a result that is more stable and resistant to weeds. Excess rock flour that remains on top of the stones should be removed immediately as it can discolor the stones.

== See also ==
- Mowing strip, narrow hardscape strip used to ease lawn mowing
