= Concrete landscape curbing =

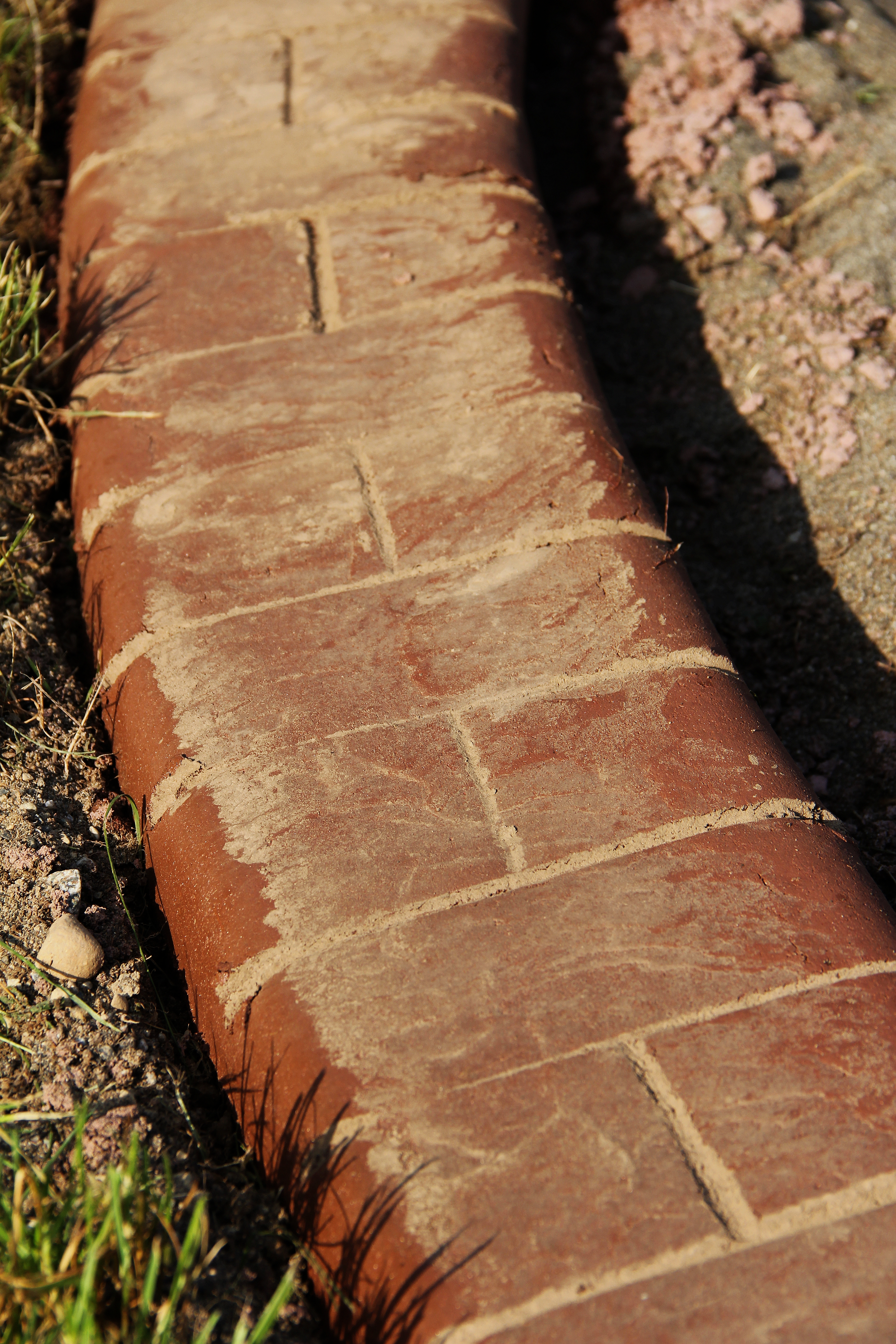
Drying died curbing.

Concrete landscape curbing, also known as concrete landscape bordering or stamped concrete edging, is an alternative to plastic or metal landscape edging. Landscape curbing is made with various elements of concrete depending on the climate where it is being used. Concrete landscape curbing has become more popular over the last decade with suppliers offering a variety of styling options.

Concrete landscape curbing has been installed in every climate in the United States and throughout the world. It is usually installed using a specialized equipment that is expensive and takes a skilled and experienced person to operate. The equipment most often utilized in landscape curbing is based on a design that originated in Australia around the 1970s.

Due to the need of professional installation, concrete landscape curbing is usually utilized as a complete system to create a permanent border.

Concrete landscape curbing can be used to highlight and emphasize a flowerbed or other landscaping area. Various colors and styles are available and the final look achieved will vary from installer to installer based on their level of training and experience. A lawn mower wheel can be run on the curbing which helps eliminate the need for mowing strip edging where a curb is installed. Because of its weight and depth in the ground, the concrete landscape curbing border acts as a root barrier, and is more elegant looking and will last for years.

== Paving ==
Concrete curbing can contain decomposed granite, pavers, brick, mulch, and other pavement and walking surfaces for paths, walkways, driveways, and other outdoor circulation.
