= Hoggin =

Compactable groundcover used for pathways

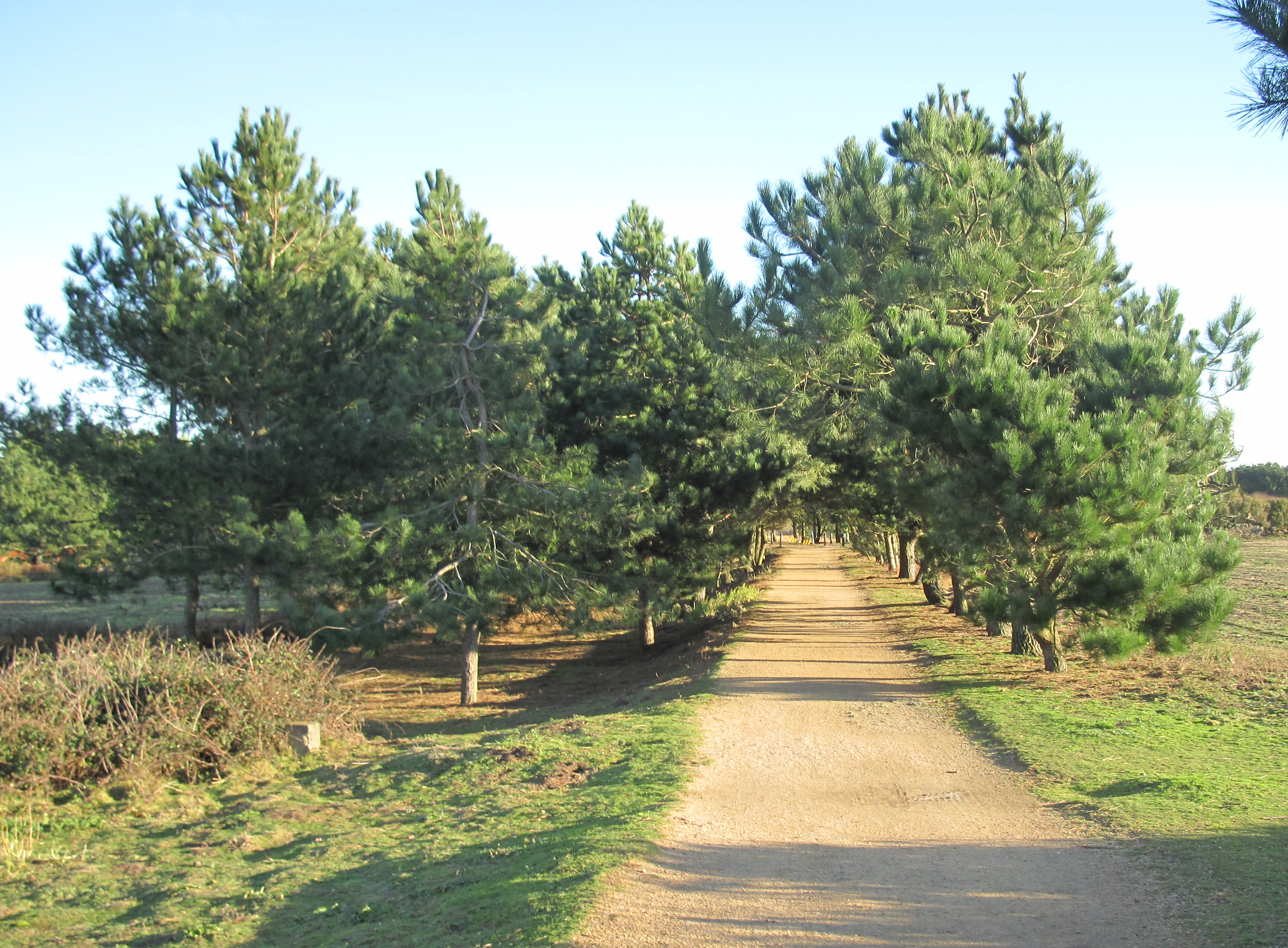
A pedestrian path laid with a hoggin surface

Hoggin (sometimes called buff, because of its colour) is a compactable groundcover that is composed of a mixture of clay, gravel, and sand or granite dust that produces a buff-coloured bound surface.

It is most commonly seen in the south of England and at National Trust properties as well as on public pathways managed by the Office of Public Works in the Republic of Ireland.

The material is aesthetically suited to older properties and is lower maintenance than gravel alone since it does not need regular raking. Once laid, the surface is somewhat permeable to water and therefore does not easily hold puddles or generate rapid surface runoff. The material is increasingly being used at domestic properties as a low cost and environmentally friendly alternative to concrete and block paving in paths and driveways.

A compacted sub-base of larger crushed stone is often laid prior to the top layer of hoggin, especially if the area to be covered is soft ground, or prone to puddling. The larger rocks provide a firm base for the hoggin, and improved drainage.

== See also ==
- Pavement (architecture)
- Road surface
