= Mowing strip =

Narrow hardscape strip used to ease lawn mowing

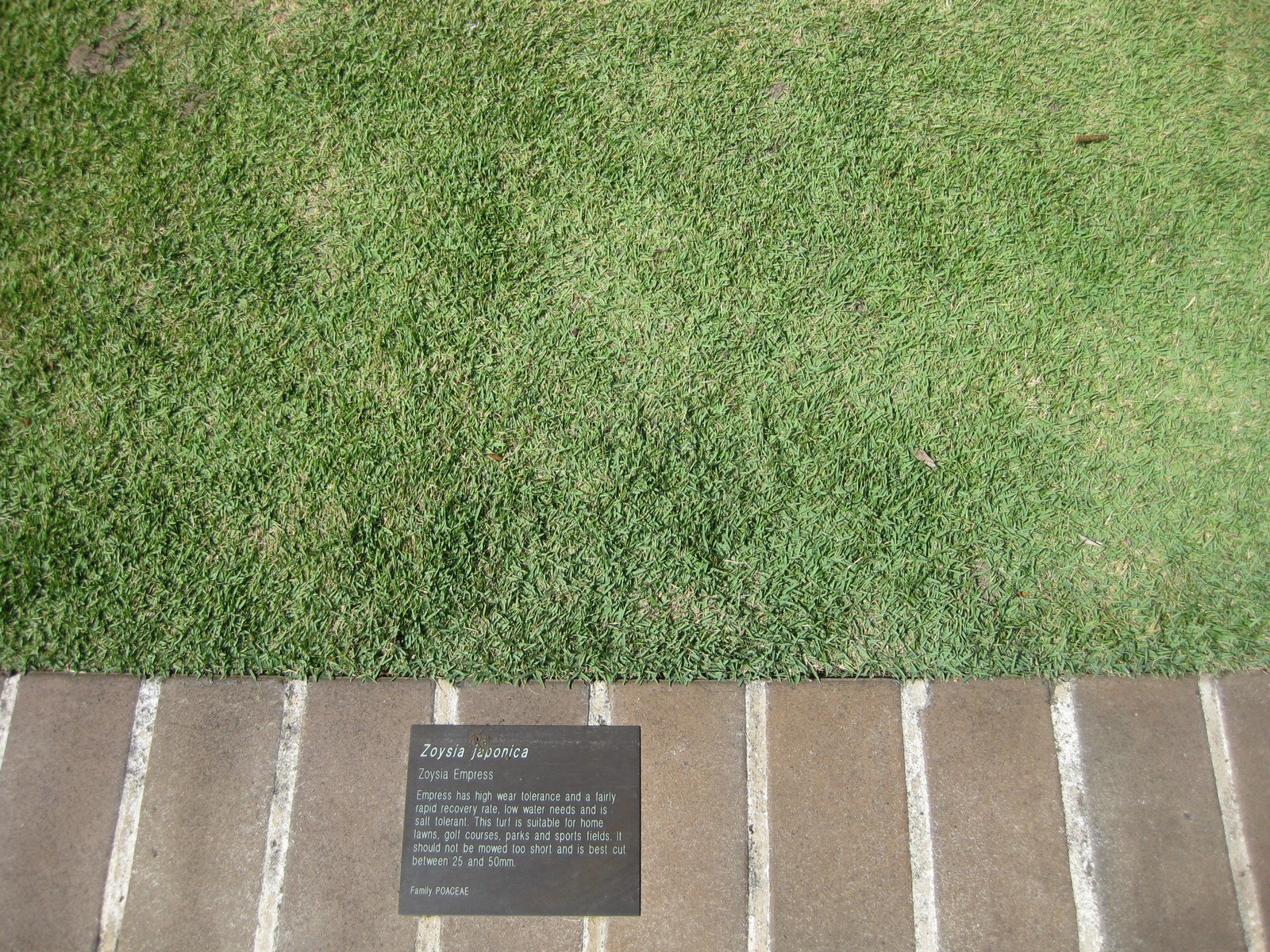
Cobblestones as a mowing border

A mowing strip (also known as a mowing edge or mowing border; in German Mähkante) is a narrow, flat hardscaping feature installed flush with the ground between a lawn and an adjacent barrier, such as a garden bed, fence, wall, or patio.

Its primary purpose is to eliminate the need for secondary string trimming or manual edging by allowing one wheel of a lawn mower to ride on top of the strip, allowing cutting of grass to the edge without damaging surrounding structures. It can also act as a root barrier to prevent grass from invading planting beds.

== Functions ==
- Lawn maintenance reduction: By providing a stable, level surface for lawn mower wheels, a moving strip can allow cutting of the lawn edge with a lawn mower safely, thereby reducing or removing the need of using string trimmers.
- Trimmer impact prevention: Moving strips can protect wooden decks, fences, et cetera from physical damage caused by high-speed impact from trimmer lines. It can also prevent spinning strings of a trimmer from dangerously launching loose stones onto the lawn or glass doors.
- Organic containment: It can act as a root barrier that keeps turfgrass from encroaching into garden beds, while simultaneously keeping mulches, soil, or gravel from spilling onto the lawn.
- Drainage: Mowing strips can be designed so that water is led away from wooden structures to prevent rot, and onto plants and suitable runoffs (see also French drain).

== Materials and construction ==
Mowing strips are usually constructed from durable materials selected based on aesthetic preference and budget. For a mowing strip to function effectively it can often be beneficial to install it flush with or slightly below (typically 10 mm or so) the level of the lawn's soil. If the strip is too high, lawn mower blades may unintentionally strike the material of the mowing strip.

The width of the mowing strip should be large enough to create a separation between different plant types or to allow the lawnmower to roll unhindered over the entire lawn so that there is no need to go over with an edger afterwards. For example, a small cutting edge can be 15 cm wide, while a wider cutting edge of 30 cm can also be used as a footpath.

Some common materials include:

- Brick and pavers: Rectangular bricks or interlocking concrete pavers can be laid end-to-end or side-by-side on a bed of compacted sand and gravel. They can be laid in various patterns, e.g. straight or curved lines.
- Poured concrete: A continuous concrete border can be poured into various forms.
- Flagstone or slate: Natural flat stones can provide a rustic appearance.

== Gallery ==
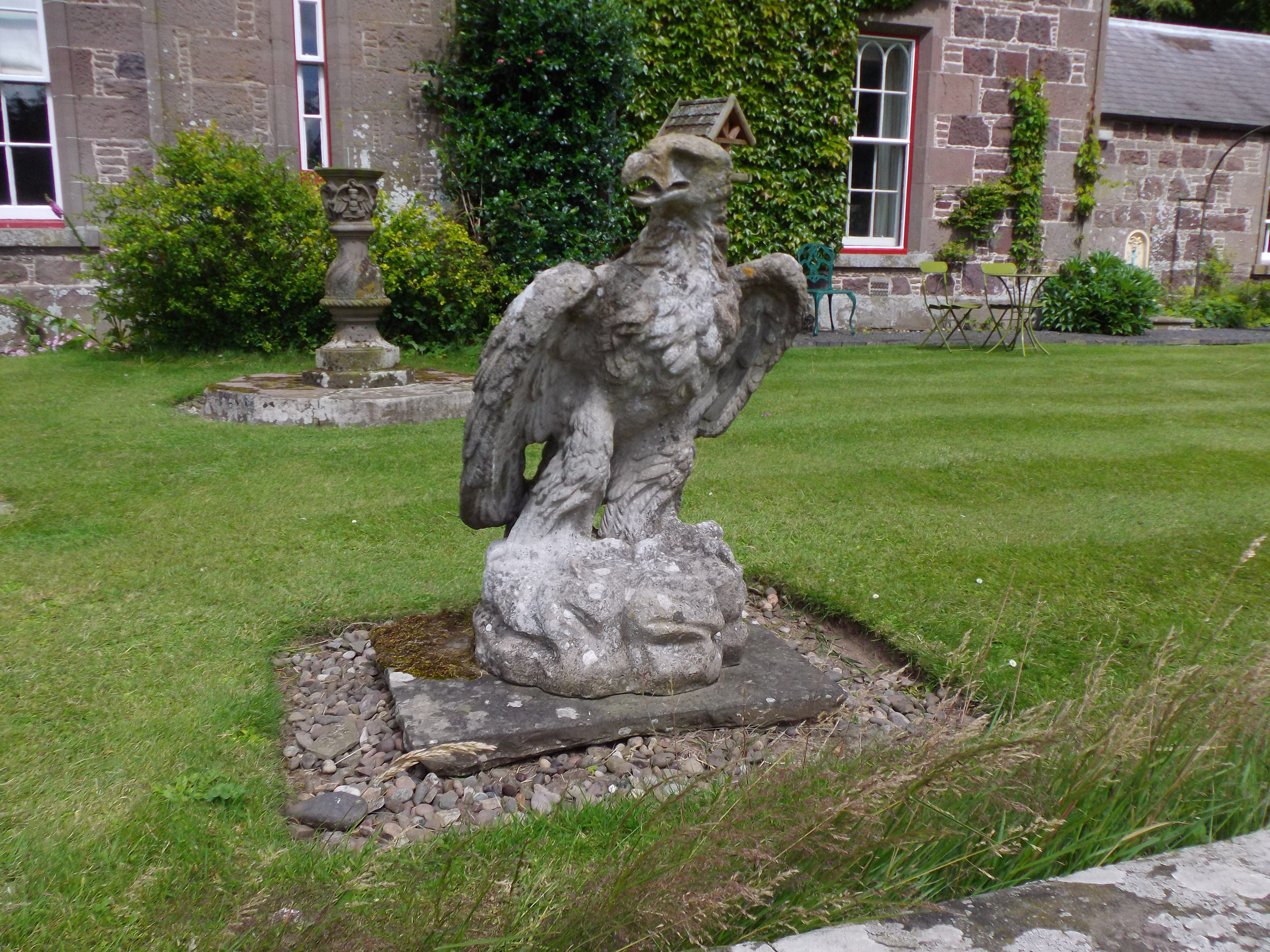
Gravel as a lawn border against a sculpted stone

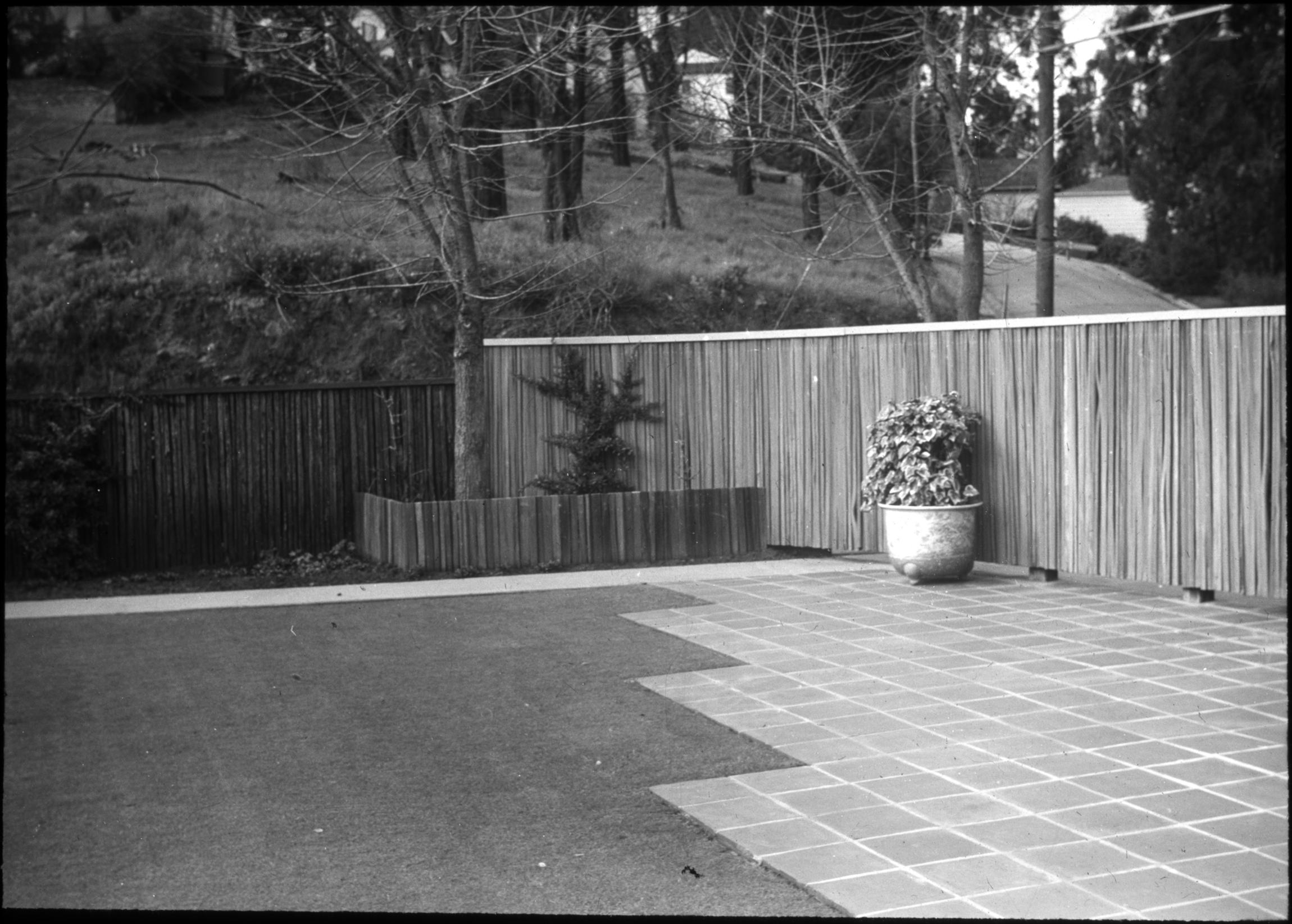
Patio tiles as border against the grass

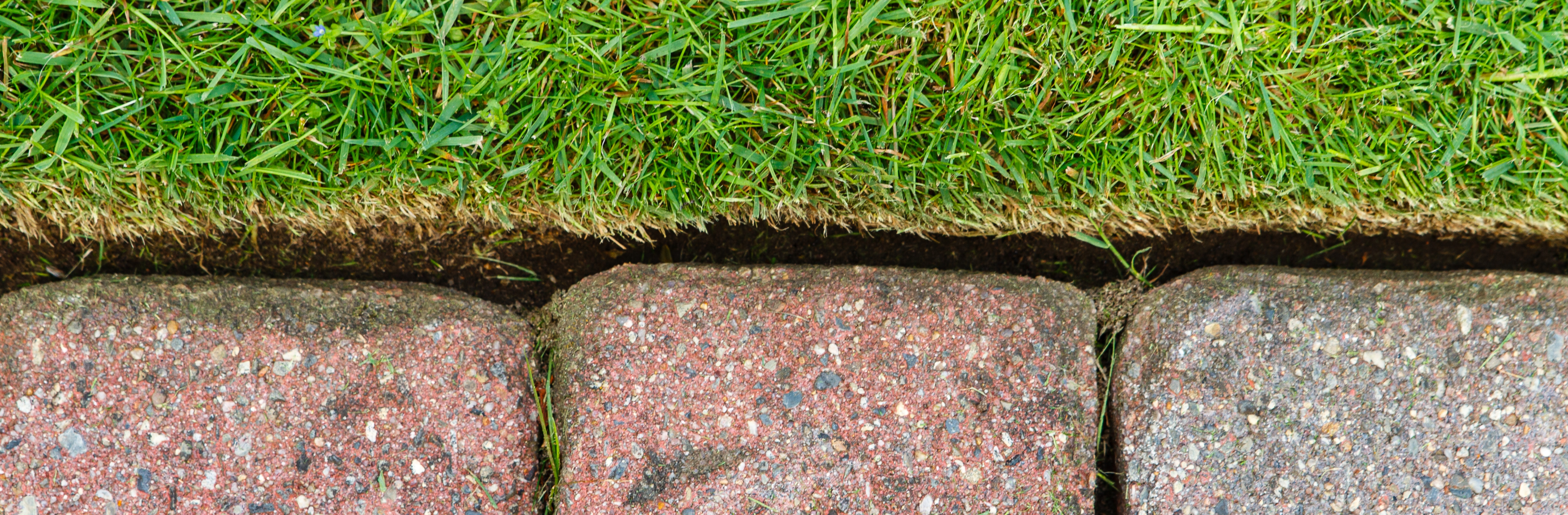
Mowed and trimmed strip

== See also ==
- Concrete landscape curbing
- Garden design
- Landscape edging
- String trimmer
