= Pavers (flooring) =

Stone or tile structure which can serve as floor; pavement type with solid blocks

A paver is a paving stone, sett, tile, brick or brick-like piece of concrete commonly used as exterior flooring. They are generally placed on top of a foundation which is made of layers of compacted stone and sand. The pavers are placed in the desired pattern and the space between pavers that is created with the integrated spacer bar is then filled with concrete sand or a polymeric sand. No actual adhesive or retaining method is used other than the weight of the paver itself except edging. Pavers can be used to make roads, driveways, patios, walkways and other outdoor platforms.

In a factory, concrete pavers are made with a mixture of sand, stone, cement and iron oxide pigments in a mold and then cured prior to packaging.

== History ==
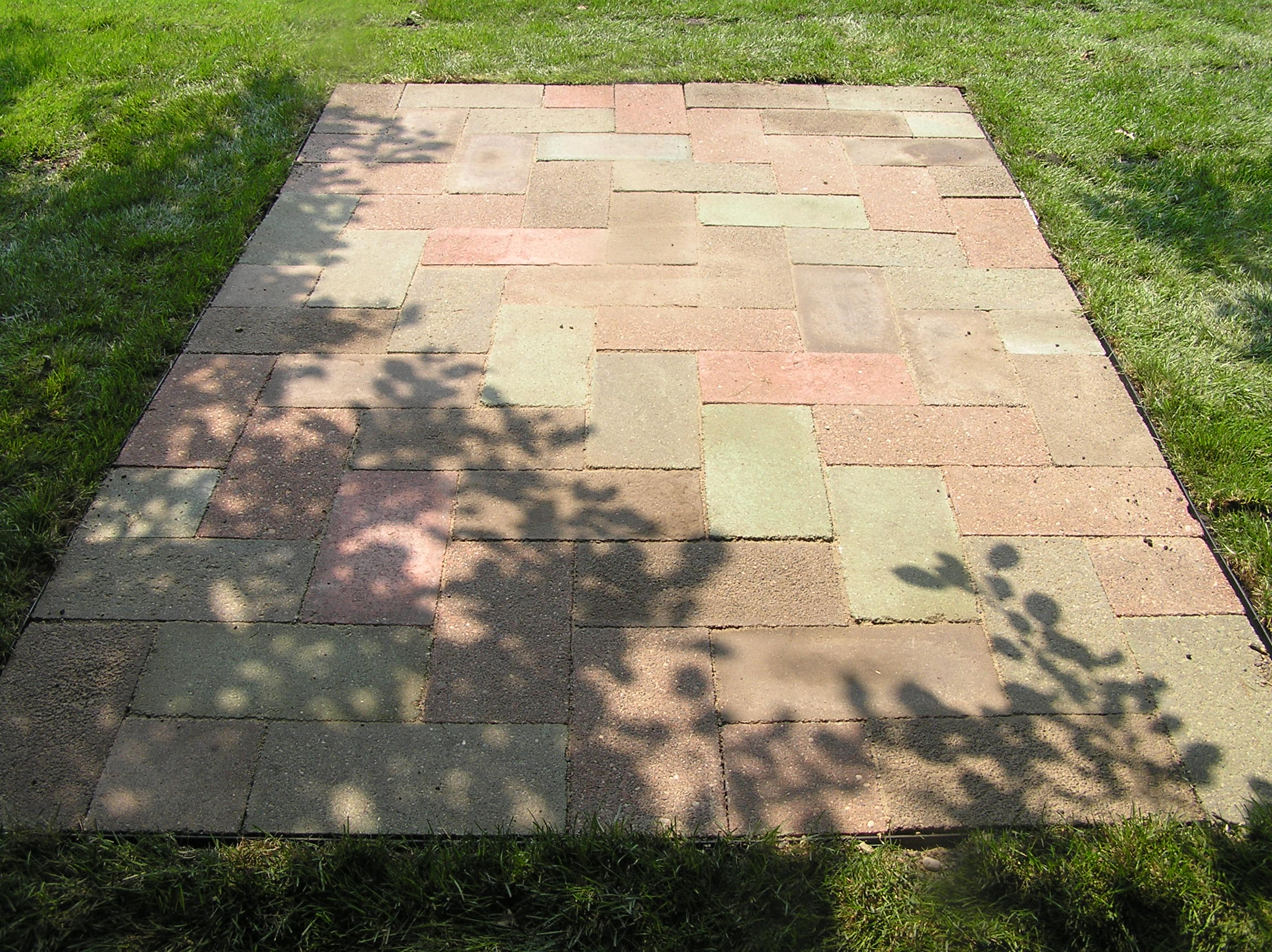
Concrete paver blocks in a rectangular pattern

The first concrete pavers were created by Peter Stuart of the Stuart & Company who was a mass producer of concrete pavement in Edinburgh, Scotland in 1872. Selections of their product have been documented by the Historic Environment Scotland. In the United States Of America the push for better roads was heavily surfaced in the 19th century, but in Portland, Oregon it became a main focus as a new movement called the Good Roads Movement and the main people to push it were the League of American Bicyclists and the farmers of Oregon pushed for more industrialized roads and so concrete paver roads were installed.

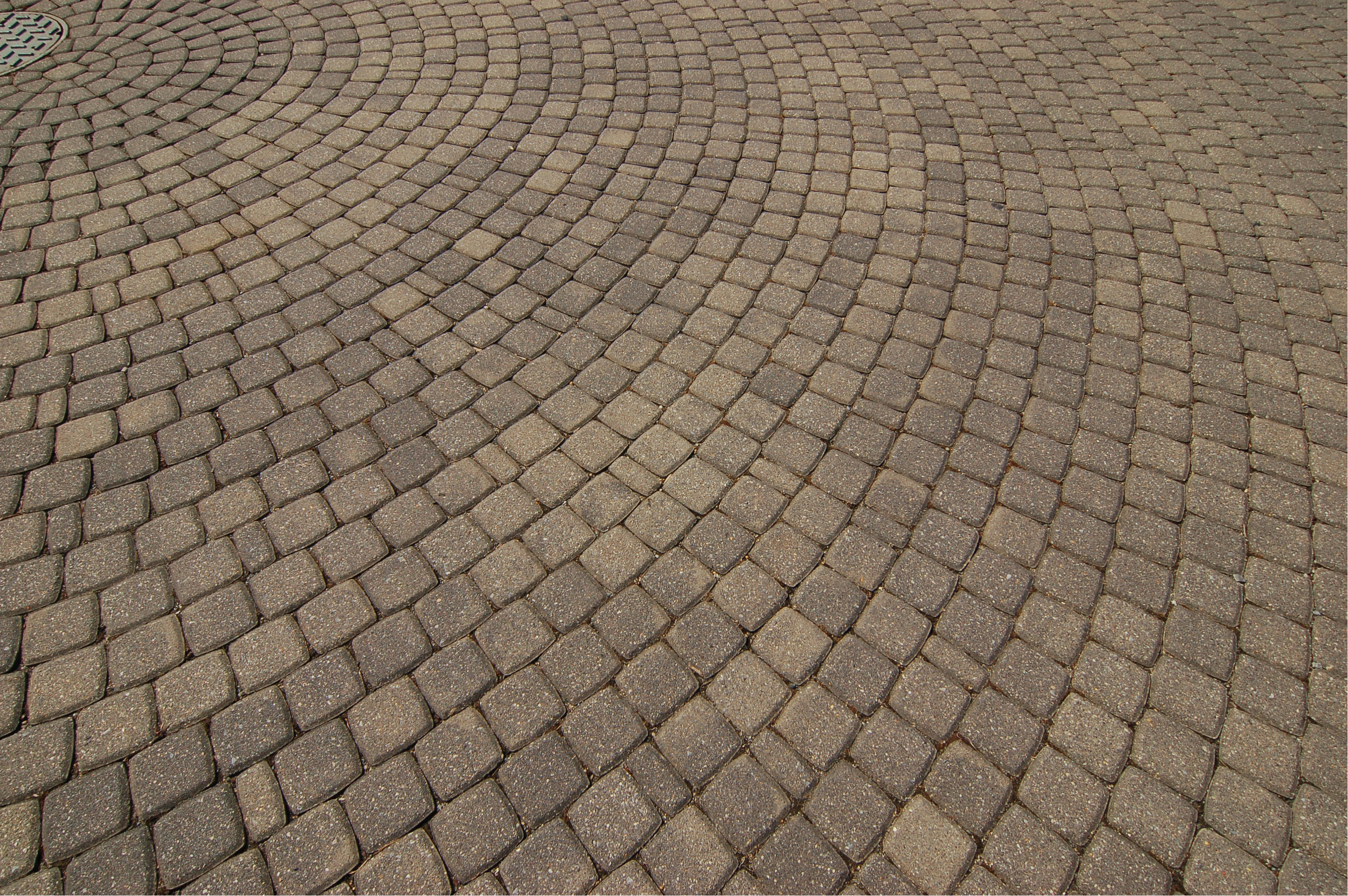
Concrete paver blocks laid in a circular pattern

== Block paving ==
Block paving, also known as brick paving, is a commonly used decorative method of creating a pavement or hardstanding. The main benefit of bricks over other materials is that individual bricks can later be lifted up and replaced. This allows for remedial work to be carried out under the surface of the paving without leaving a lasting mark once the paving bricks have been replaced. Typical areas of use would be for driveways, pavement, patios, town centres, pedestrian precincts and more commonly in road surfacing. Bricks are typically made of concrete or clay, though other composite materials are also used. Each has its own means of construction. The biggest difference is the way they set hard ready for use. A clay brick has to be fired in a kiln to bake the brick hard. A concrete brick has to be allowed to set. The concrete paving bricks are a porous form of brick formed by mixing small stone hardcore, dyes, cement and sand and other materials in various amounts. Many block paving manufacturing methods are now allowing the use of recycled materials in the construction of the paving bricks, such as crushed glass and crushed old building rubble.

There are many different laying patterns that can be achieved using block paving. The most common of these is the herringbone pattern. This pattern is the strongest of the block paving bonds as it offers the most interlock, therefore making it a good choice for driveways and road surfacing. A herringbone pattern can be created by setting the blocks at either 45 degrees or 90 degrees to the perpendicular. Other popular types of pattern include stretcher bond and basketweave; with the latter being better suited to paved areas that will only receive light foot traffic, due to its weaker bond.

A commonly used base is 'cracker dust' or commonly known as crushed bluemetal. The advantage of using this in residential living is that it compacts a lot harder than yellow brickies sand, which prevents weeds and ants from coming through.

== Concrete pavers ==
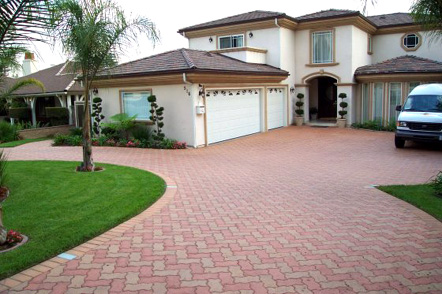
Interlocking concrete paver driveway

Pavers come in a number of styles, shapes and tones. Pavers manufactured from concrete go well with flag, brick and concrete walkways or patios. Concrete pavers may be used where winter temperatures dip below freezing. They are available in hole, x-shape, y-shape, pentagon, polygon and fan styles.

An interlocking concrete paver, also known as a segmental paver, is a type of paver. This paver has emerged over the last couple of decades as a very popular alternative to brick, clay or concrete. An interlocker is a concrete block paver which is designed in such a way that it locks in with the next paver. The locking effect allows for a stronger connection between pavers, but this interlocking system relies on the addition of joint sand swept between the gaps. The friction created by this joint sand distributes weight and makes the paving itself resistant to movement under traffic.

Segmental pavers have been used for thousands of years. The Romans built roads with them that are still there. But it was not until the mid-1940s that pavers began to be produced out of concrete. It started in the Netherlands where all the roads are made to be flexible because much of the country is below sea level and the ground shifts, moves and sinks. Poured concrete is not an option because it will crack. Individual units not set in concrete, and placed in sand perform far better than concrete. Before the paver was made from concrete, either real stone or a clay product was used.

The first production of concrete pavers in North America was in Canada, in 1973. Due to their success, paving stone manufacturing plants began to open throughout the United States working their way from east to west.

The first concrete pavers were shaped just like a brick, 4 by 8 inches (100 mm × 200 mm), and they were called Holland Stones. These units turned out to be economical to produce and were exceedingly strong.

In addition to being economical, interlocking concrete pavers are also widely available in water-permeable designs, which have added ecological benefits. By allowing water to drain through the pavers in a way that mimics natural absorption, builders and landscapers are able to limit surface runoff and prevent soil erosion or buildup of standing water in the surrounding land area. Some permeable paver installations are designed to harvest rainwater, which can then be repurposed for uses such as irrigation or washing a car. Permeable paver applications have also been found to offer benefits in filtering contaminants of the water being captured.

== Modern installation method ==
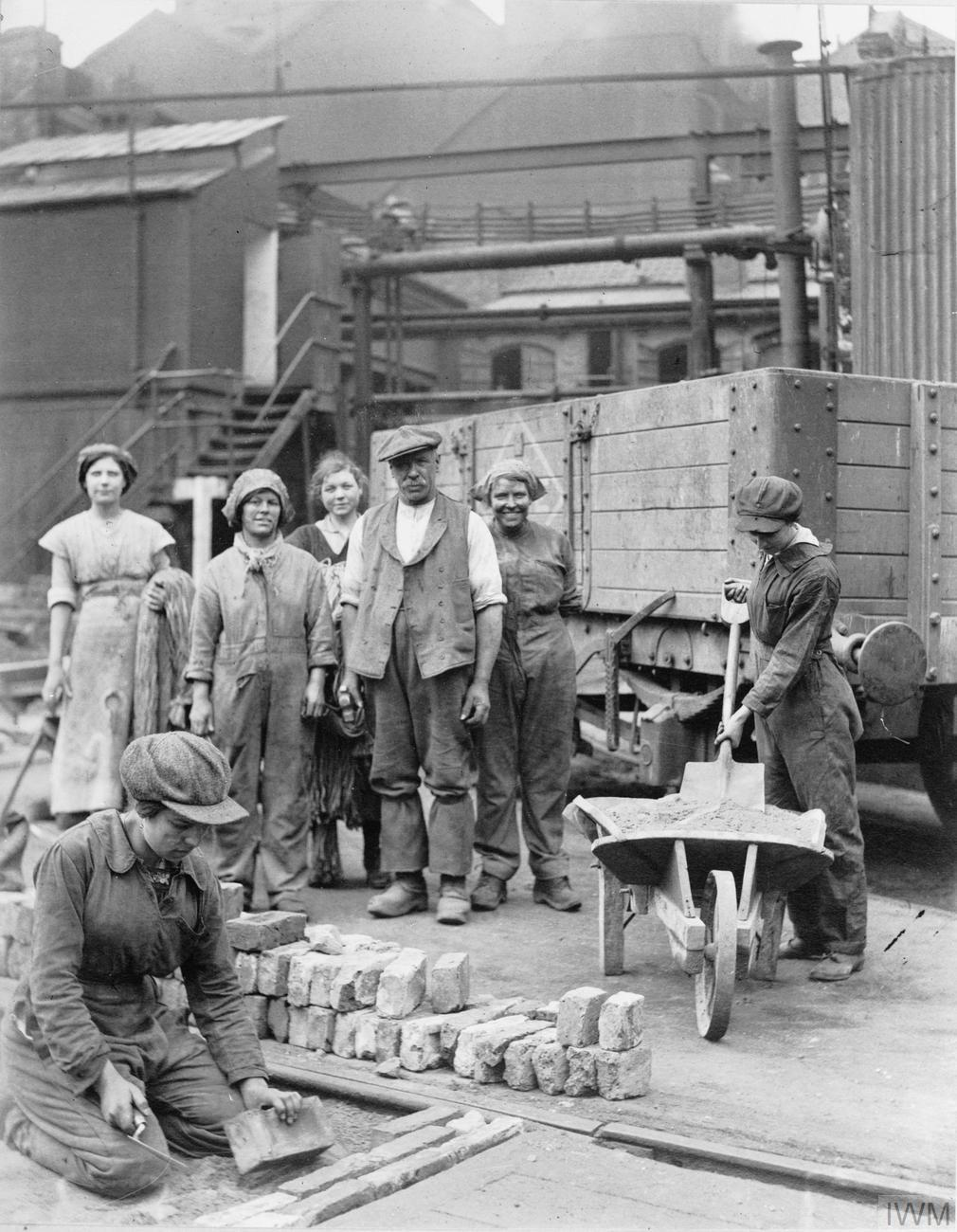
A worker installing a brick walkway

Pavers must have a strong base, a flat bedding and an edge restraint.

=== Base ===
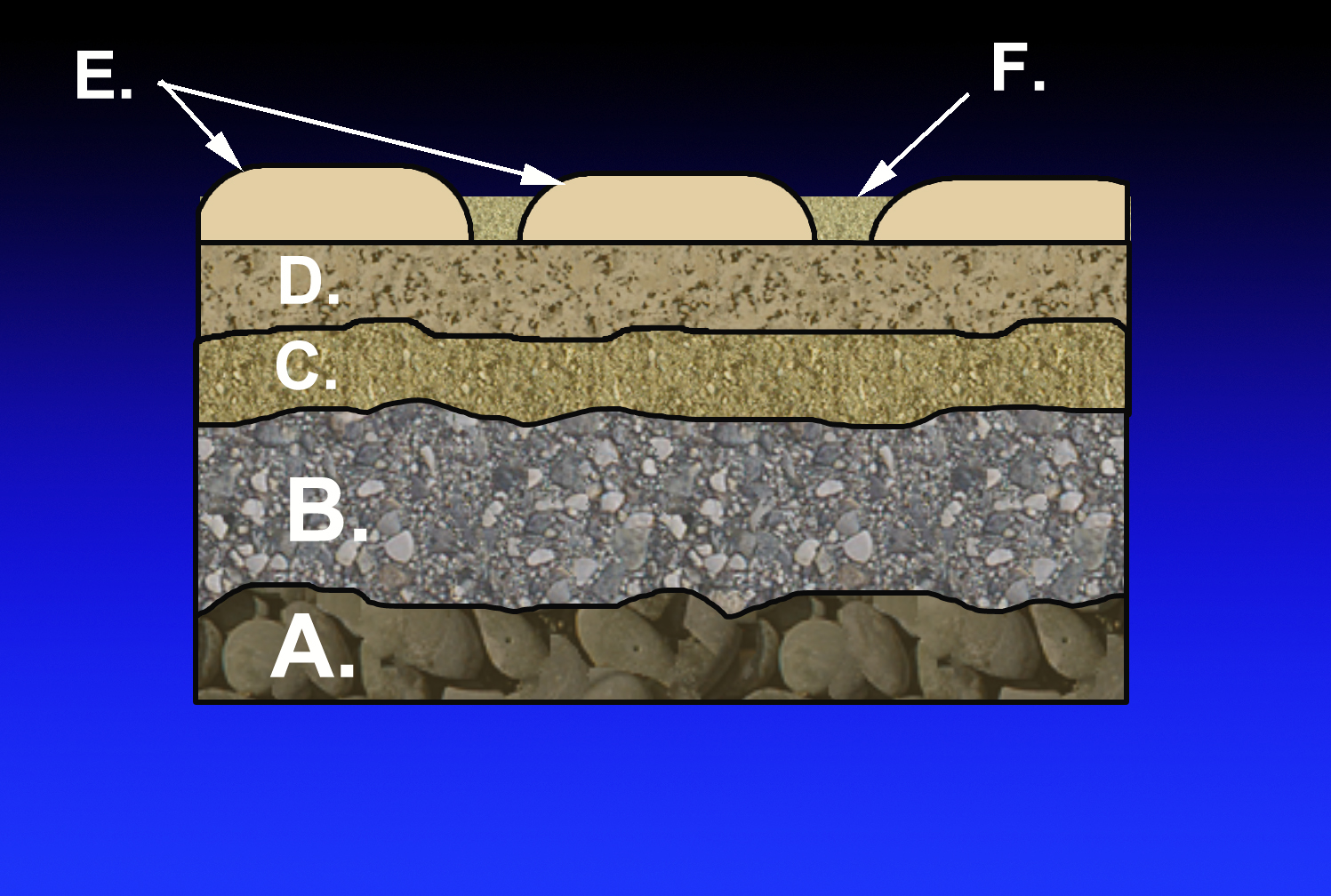
Layers in the construction of a mortarless pavement: A.) Subgrade B.) Subbase C.) Base course D.) Paver base E.) Pavers F.) Fine-grained sand.

To prevent the soil from absorbing the base layer above, there should be a compacted sub-base (which is the naturally occurring soil) and a layer of landscape fabric. Landscape fabric is not required in every application. All compaction is usually performed with a plate compactor or hand tamper. All sand-containing materials (e.g., concrete sand, rock dust, or minus crushed rock) must be soaked with water for effective compaction. The base layer should be 6 in (15 cm) deep for walkways, or 12 in (30 cm) deep for driveways. The base material should either be 3/4 in (19 mm) crushed stone (to allow water to drain through it) for a 1/4 in (6 mm) crushed stone bedding, or 3/4 in (19 mm) minus crushed stone (to prevent sand from sinking through it) for a concrete sand bedding. The base should be compacted every 6 inches (15 cm). If the base layer is deeper than 6 inches (15 cm), then biaxial geogrid should be added every 6 inches (15 cm) and spaced evenly throughout the bedding to maintain stability. If reliable concrete is already installed that can be used as the base layer.

=== Bedding ===
Above the base layer, there should be a 1 in (2.5 cm) bedding layer. A 1/4 in (6 mm) crushed stone bedding material is favored over concrete sand on walkways for its better drainage that mitigates freeze-thaw shifting, easier compaction especially on rainy days, and less weed growth. A concrete sand (specifically ASTM C33) bedding is preferable for building driveways with tighter joints (i.e., thinner cracks) because the sand is small enough to be raised up into the cracks when the pavers are compacted. This raised concrete sand helps lock the pavers in place so that they can handle more weight.

Concrete sand is a more preferable bedding layer than rock dust. Because rock dust retains rather than drains water, it prevents polymeric sand from drying and curing. Additionally, when that water in the rock dust eventually evaporates, it will carry salts through the pavers which will deposit on their surface and stain them with "efflorescence build-up". Additionally, compacting pavers levels them easier on sand than on rock dust.

The bedding layer must be flattened by "screeding" it. To screed the bedding, scrape a straightedge (such as a level) along the top of the bedding. To guide the straightedge, it is common to place parallel metal rails on top of the bedding, or have 1 in (2.5 cm) PVC pipes laid on the base so that they reach the top of the bedding. If using pipes, their indentation must be filled with bedding material once removed. A slight slope towards a drain is usually implemented. The pavers are hammered with a mallet when placing them down to help them settle and prevent them from wobbling.

=== Edge restraint and sealing ===
Edge restraints prevent pavers from spreading apart and maintain the integrity of the pavement system to move uniformly with freeze thaw cycles as well. An edge restraint can be a concrete slope which is no steeper than 45 degrees, and meets the edge pavers halfway between its top and bottom surface so that it can be buried. Alternatively, commercial plastic edge restraints can be anchored into the ground with steel spikes.

After the pavers have been laid and cleaned with a pressure washer, and they must be dried according recommendations the particular polymeric sand (usually at least for one hot summer day). After they have been dried, sweep the polymeric sand into the cracks, then compact the pavers to help the sand sink in (often with a wood panel between the pavers and the compactor to prevent chipping the pavers), and then rinse according to the polymeric sand's instructions. This sand prevents weeds from growing between them, and helps them lock into place. Do not sweep the polymeric sand more than 10 feet (3 m) from where it was poured because it will sift out necessary additives. Note that different types of polymeric sand can handle different joint widths and depths, and they often have require slightly different methods of rinsing. Applying paver sealer or concrete sealer bi-annually prevents stains from getting on the pavers.

== Stone pavers ==
A stone paver is another type of paver. This type of paver is used widely in building and landscaping as it is highly prized for beauty, strength and durability. Stone pavers are made of many materials including limestone, bluestone, basalt (such as that from The Palisades used in New York City), sandstone and granite.

Travertine is a durable, low-porous stone that stays cool in direct sunlight, making it a popular choice for pool-sides, patios, walkways and outdoor entertainment areas. Travertine is salt tolerant and has a low sunlight reflection. Granite pavers have high integral strength and density making it easy to maintain and hard-wearing in outdoor use. Limestone pavers are cut from natural limestone blocks, a sedimentary rock found in mountainous areas and ocean sea beds. Limestone tends to have unique natural colour variations. Sandstone pavers are derived from natural stone and tend to be used for sidewalks, patios and backyards.

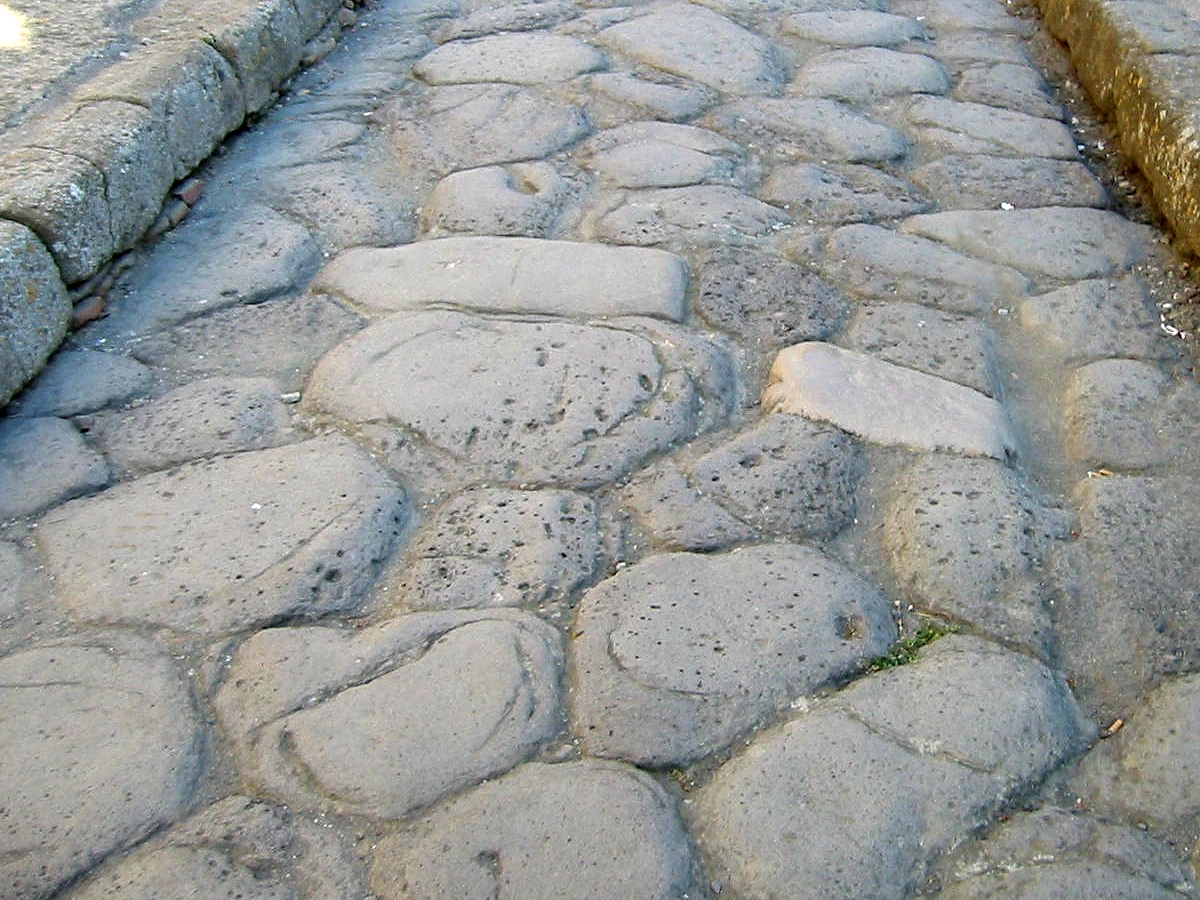
Roman stone pavement in Herculaneum

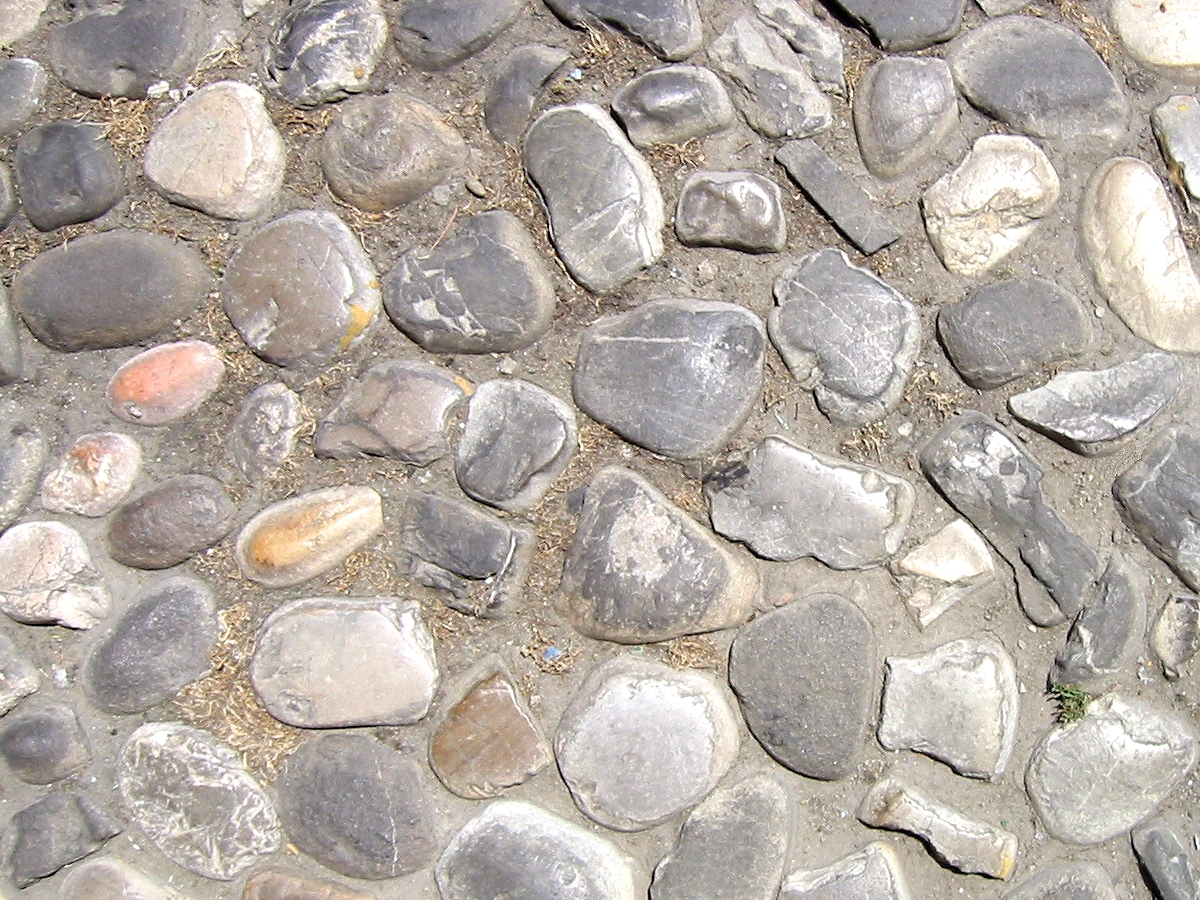
Cobblestone pavement in Italy

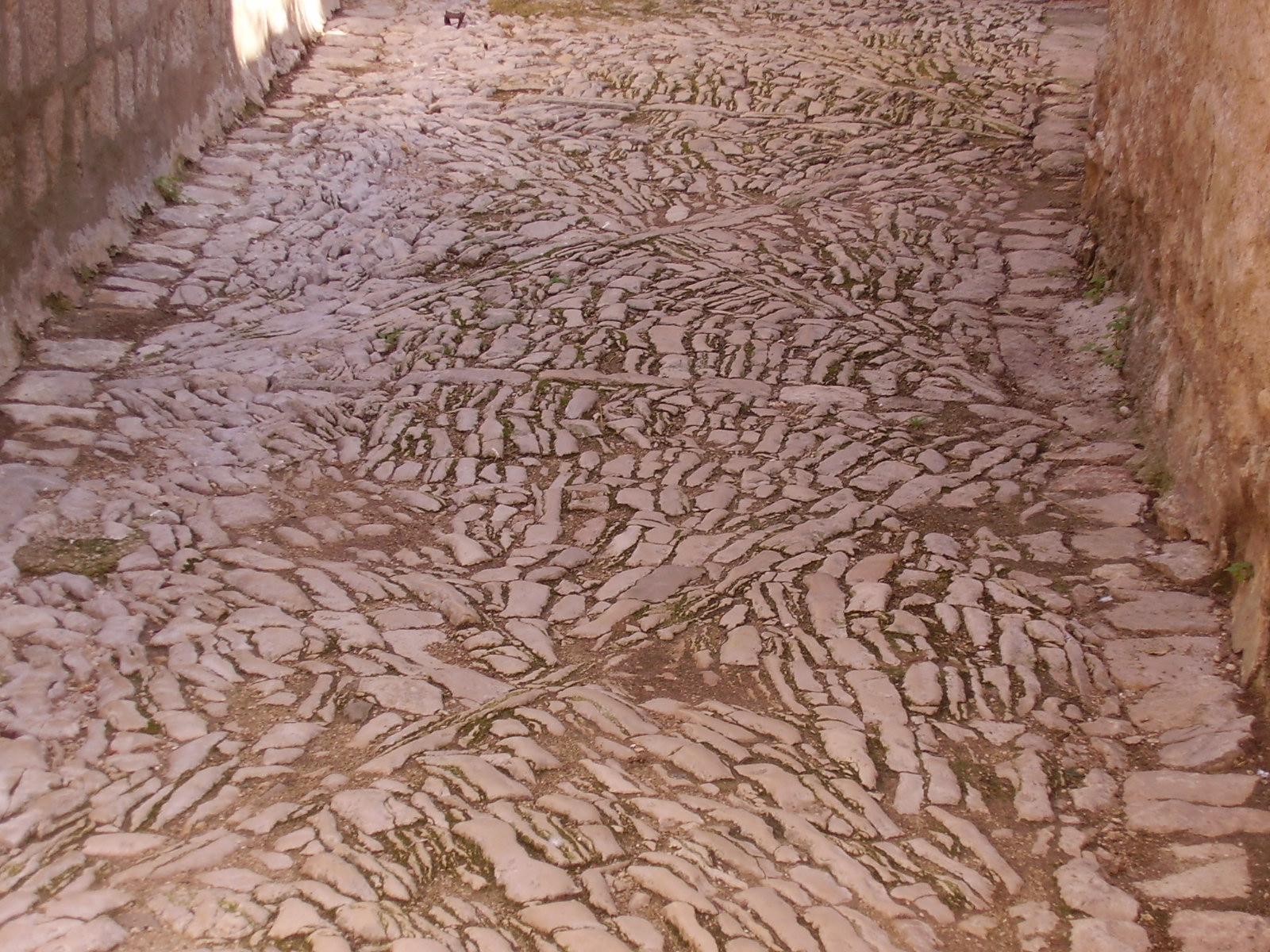
Cobblestone pavement in Cres, Croatia

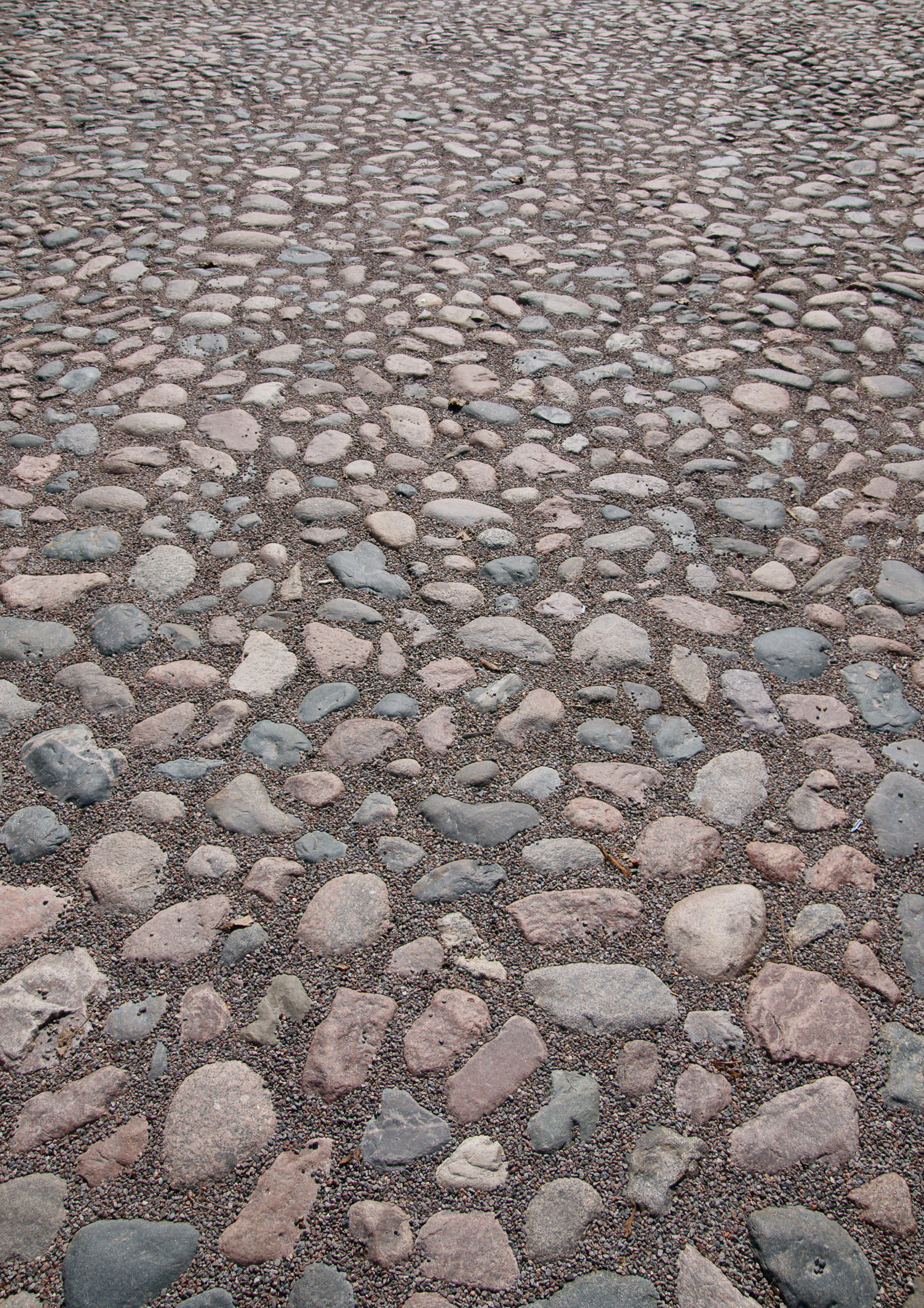
Cobblestone pavement in Porvoo, Finland

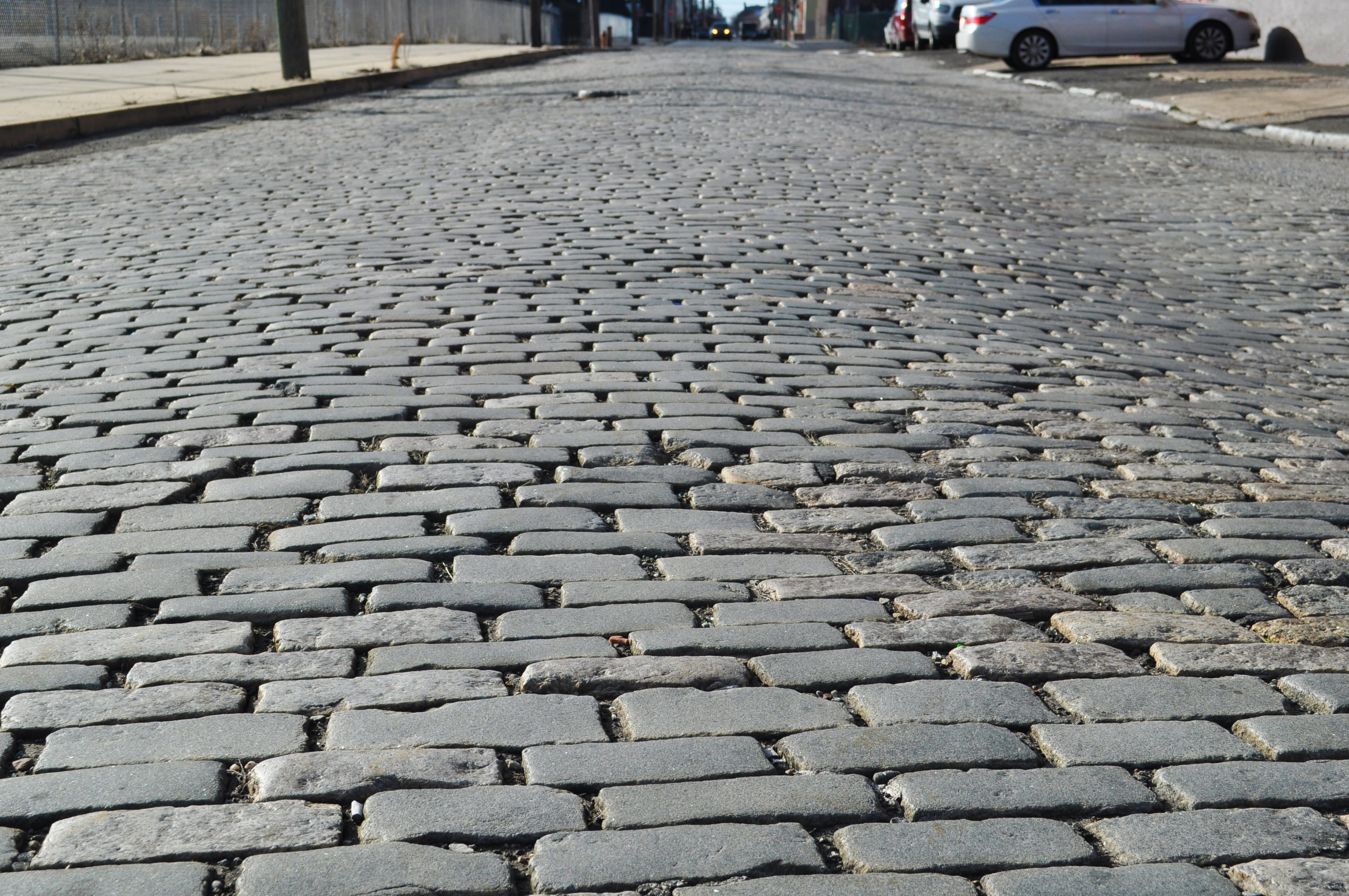
Belgian block street in Philadelphia

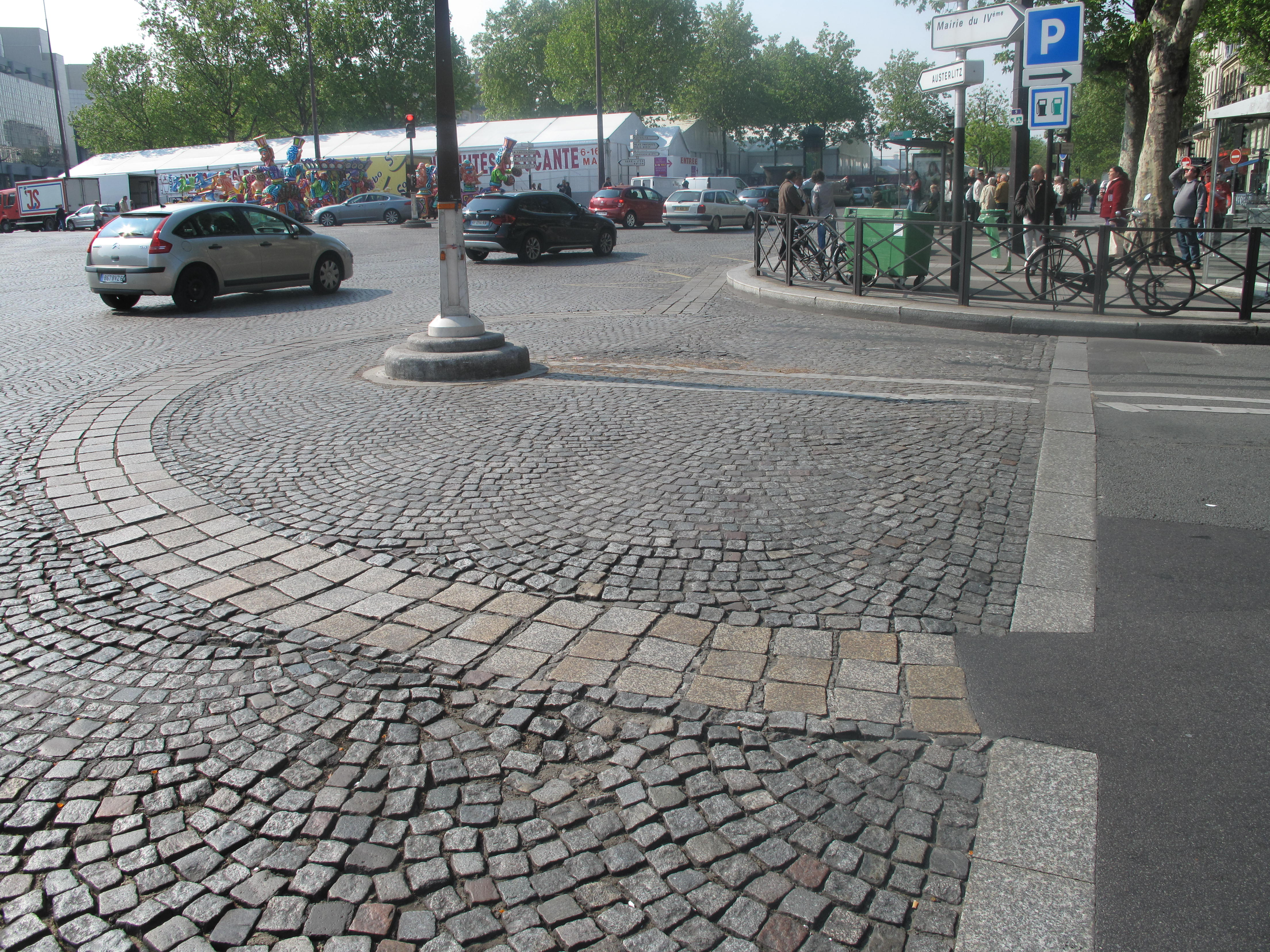
Sett pavement in Paris

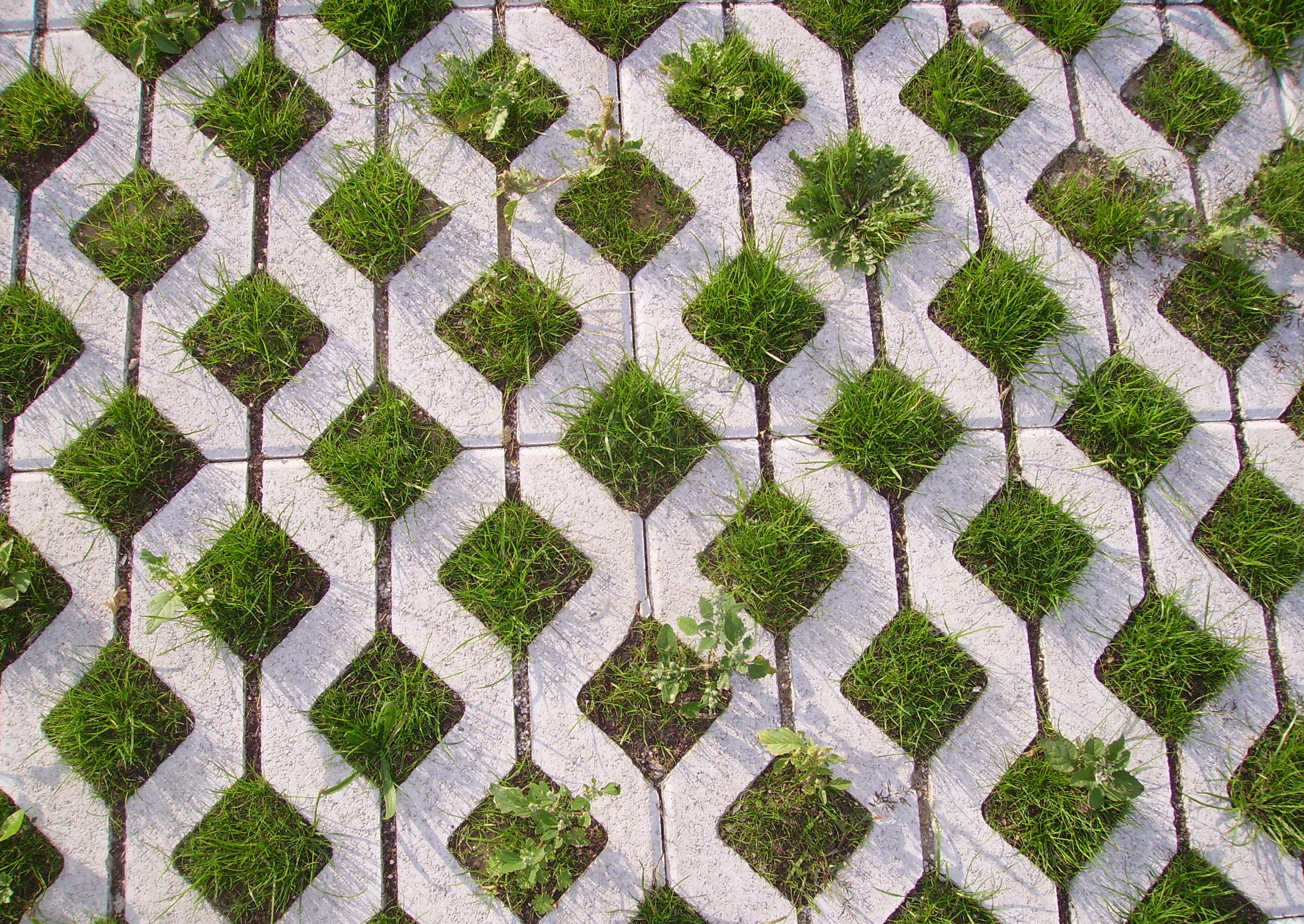
Permeable pavement

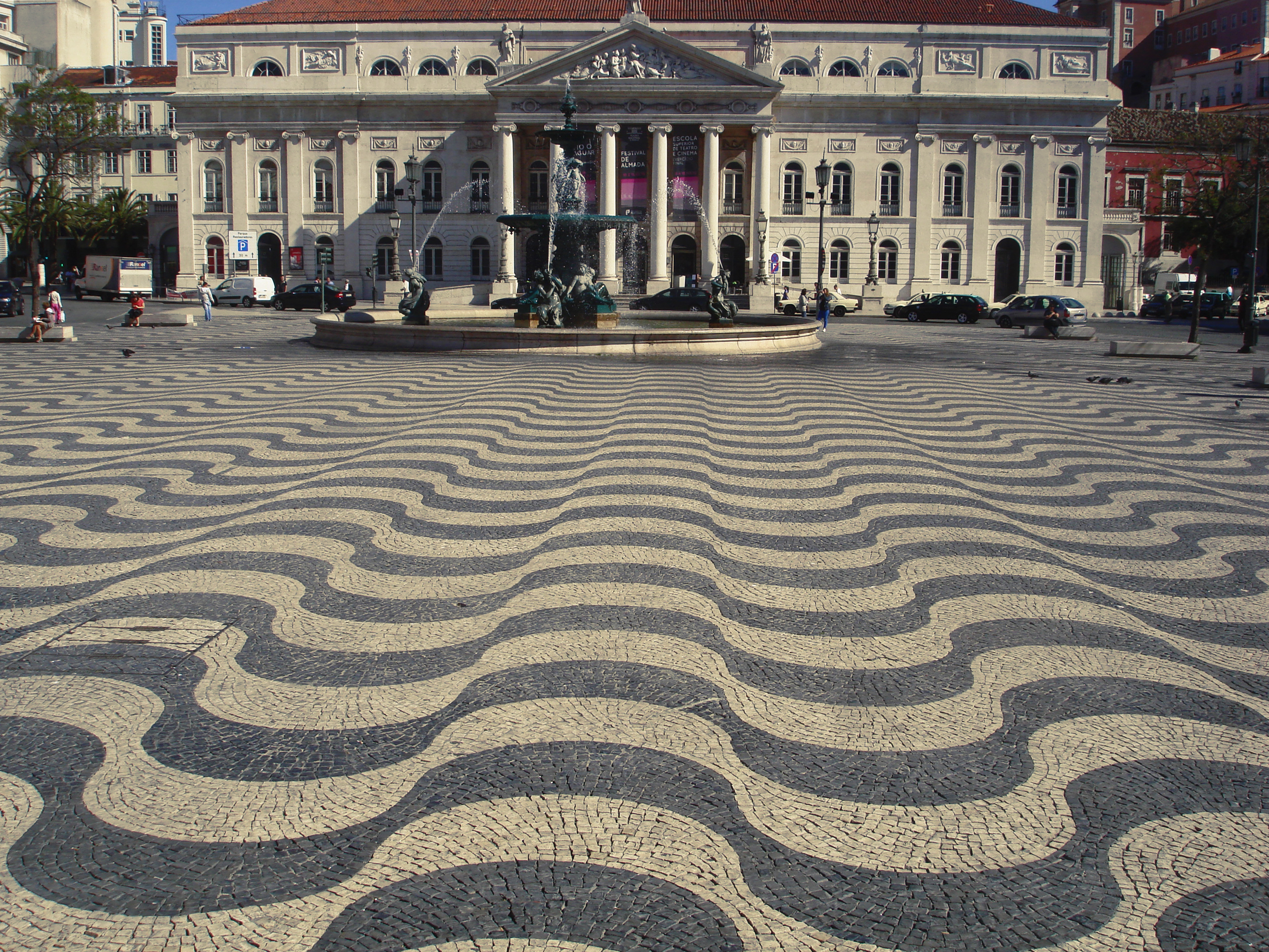
Portuguese pavement of black basalt and white limestone in Lisbon

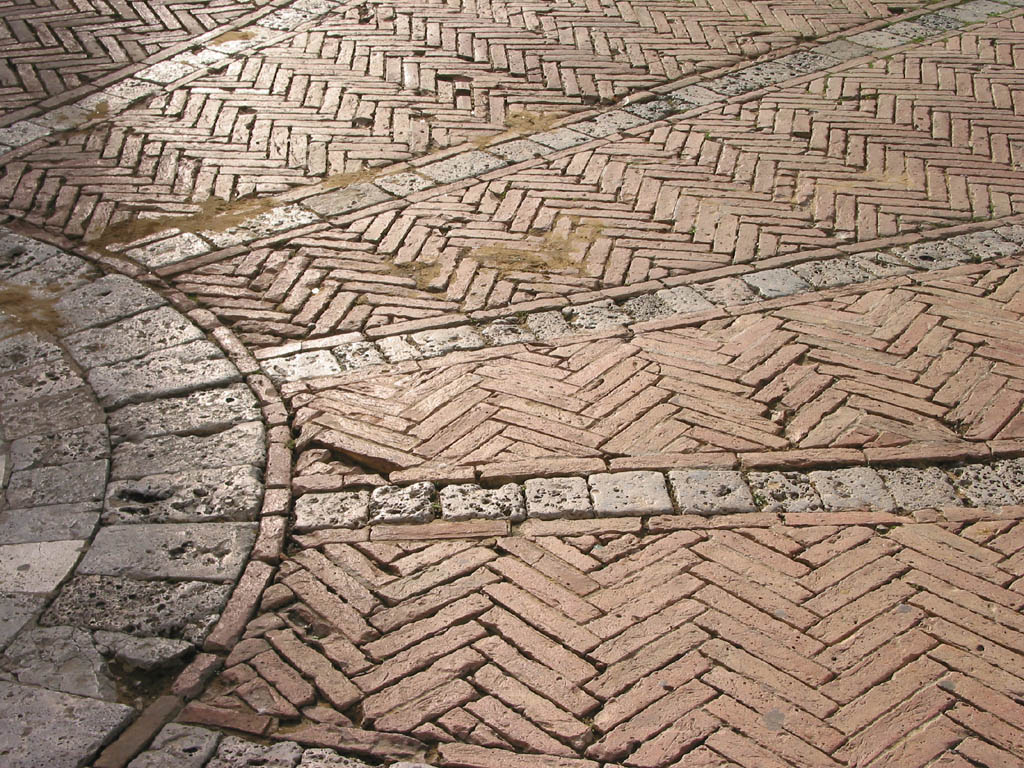
Brick pavement in Piazza del Campo, Siena

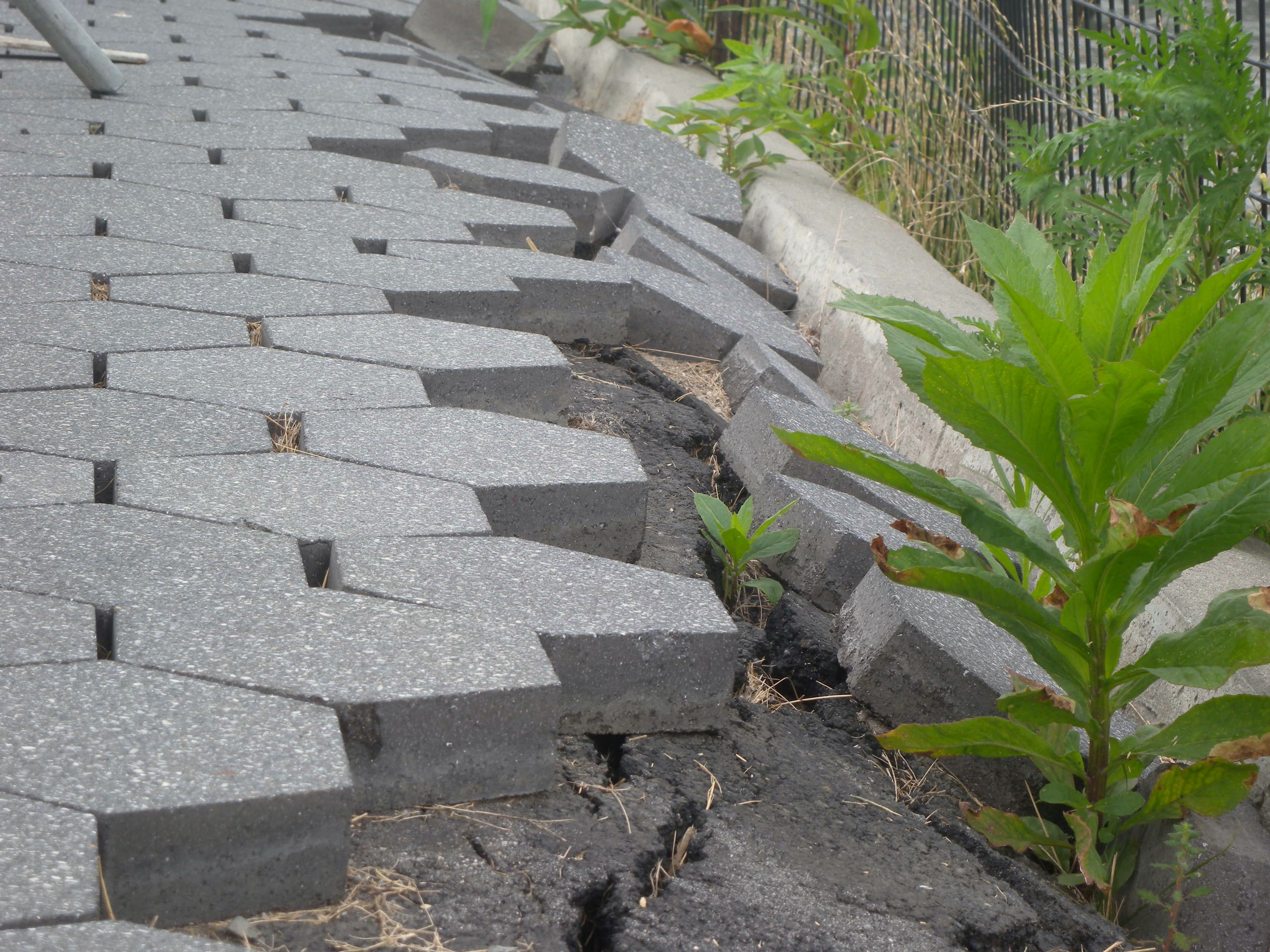
Hexagonal trylinka patented in 1933 by Władysław Tryliński, crumbling in New York

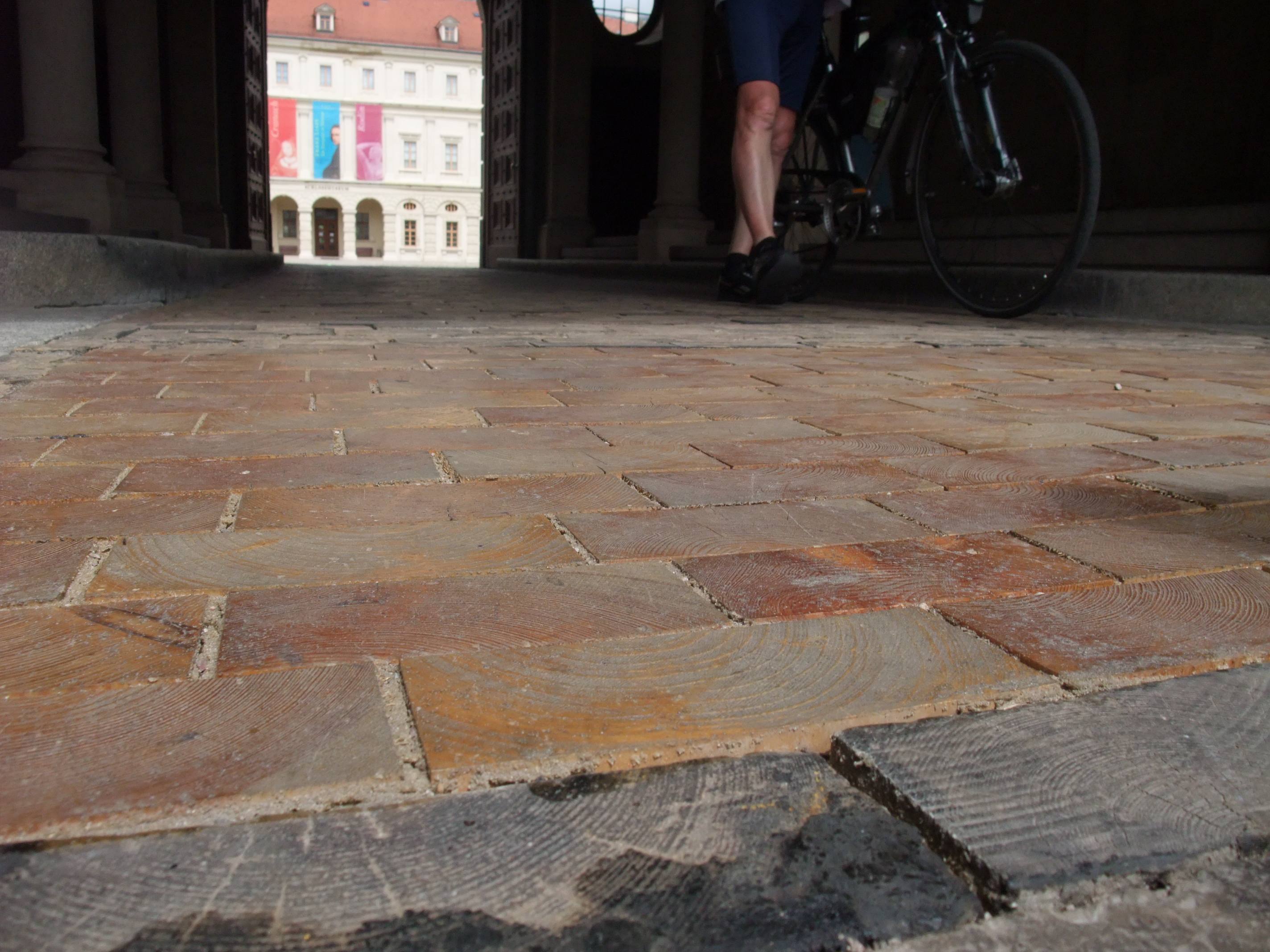
Wood paving may be used indoors as a flooring material

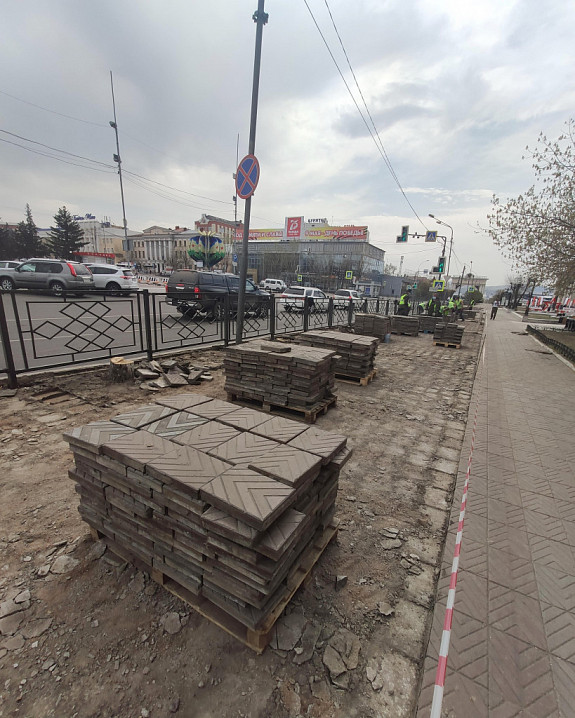
Laying paving slabs in the center of Ulan-Ude, Russia

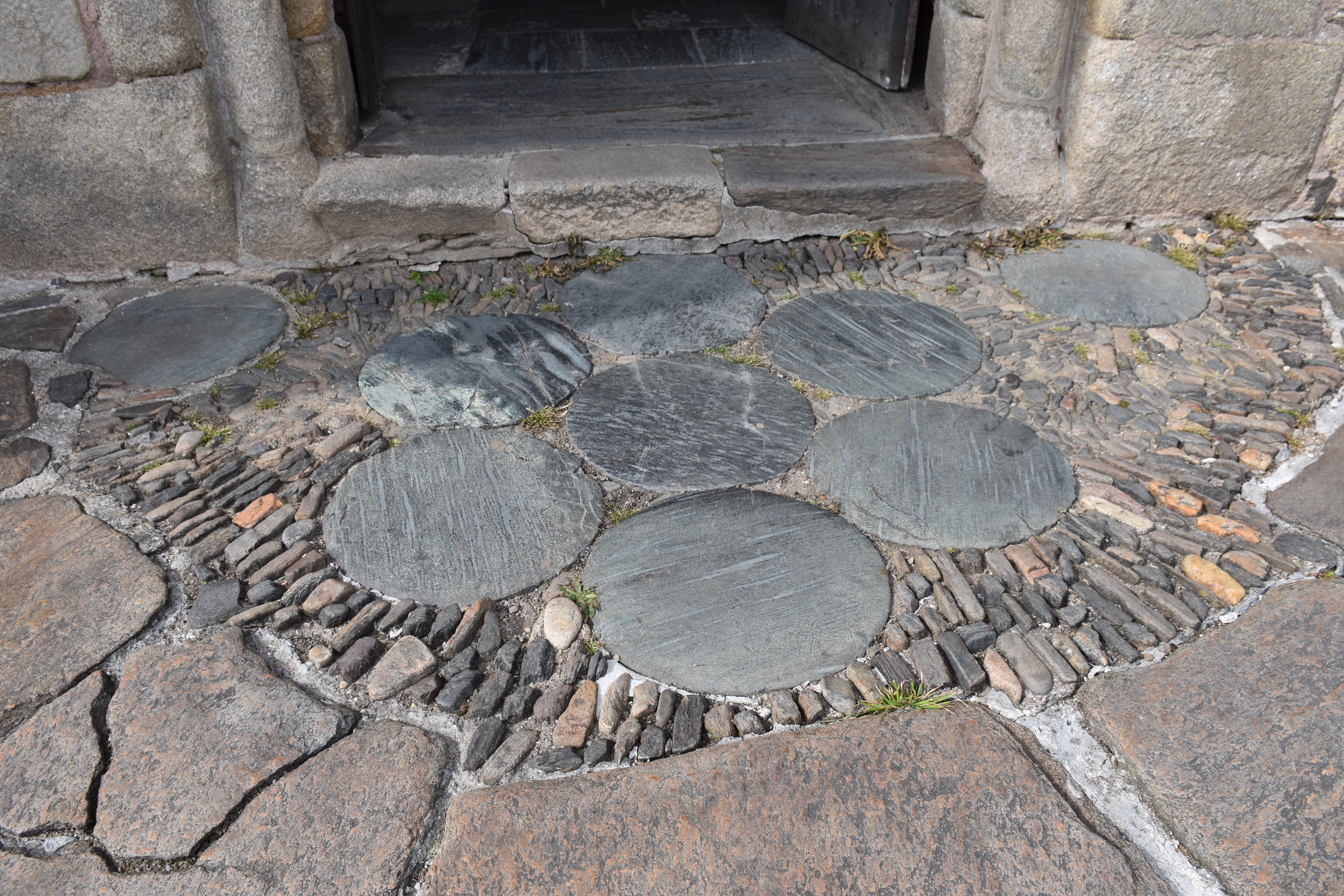
Pavement of forecourt of Abbaye Saint-Pierre of Uzerche, France

== See also ==
- Cool pavement
- Hoggin
- Macadam
- Pavement (York)
- Permeable paving
- Polymer soil stabilization
- Whitetopping
