= Cool pavement =

Reflective road surface

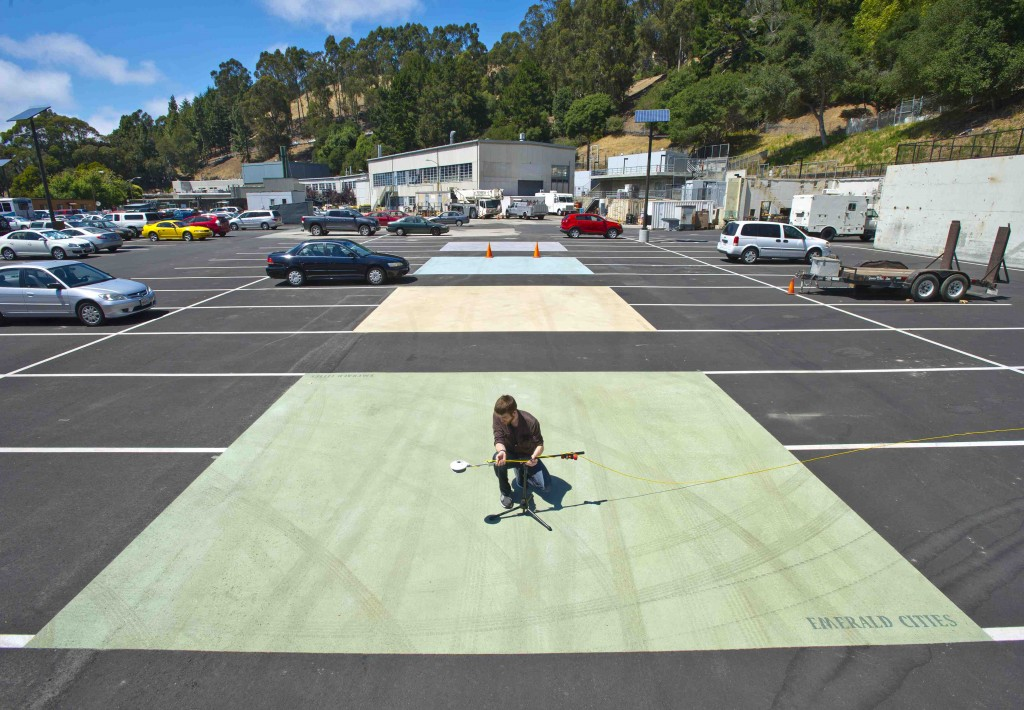
Lawrence Berkeley National Laboratory's Heat Island Group demonstrating cool pavement surfaces on a portion of a temporary parking lot at Berkeley Lab

Cool pavement is defined by the United States Environmental Protection Agency as pavement that implements technologies contributing to heat island effect reduction efforts. Most cool pavements either increase pavement albedo to reflect shortwave radiation out of the atmosphere and reduce heat transfer to the Earth's surface, or use evaporative water cooling through the pavement to lower ambient temperatures. Newer technologies involve energy harvesting, heat storage methods, and phase change materials. Cool pavements are commonly made with reflective coatings or aggregates applied to conventional pavements or incorporation of porous or permeable materials. While pavement load capability may be reduced with more frequent maintenance requirements, cool pavements show promising results in reducing ambient temperatures and reducing energy usage.

== Development ==
The United States Environmental Protection Agency defines cool pavement as pavement that implements technologies contributing to heat island effect reduction efforts. By reducing the heat island effect, cool pavement limits the energy required to keep buildings cool, which can reduce greenhouse gas emissions. Researchers at the Lawrence Berkeley National Laboratory predict that increasing solar reflectance of pavements to 35% from the standard 10% could lead to a 1 °F reduction in ambient temperature.

Cities have observed reduced temperatures after implementing cool pavements and other green infrastructure. Rome has seen up to a 50% decrease in mean radiant temperature with shaded, high-reflective pavements. Los Angeles, Phoenix, and Tokyo have also experimented with cool pavements, with Los Angeles laying out 181 lane-miles of solar-reflective coating.

Research into cool pavement technologies is still in its early stages, with current work focusing on maintenance, effectiveness quantification, and cost-efficient large-scale implementation.

== Types ==
=== Evaporative pavements ===
Evaporative pavements are a widely used type of cool pavement that reduces surface and air temperatures through water evaporation, which cools both the surface as well as the surrounding air. These pavements require moisture from rain or irrigation systems to function effectively and are engineered with permeable, water-absorbing materials such as soil additives and porous asphalt. The continuous absorption and evaporation of water can weaken their structure over time, eventually leading to degradation of the pavement surface. However, evaporative pavements come with limitations including needing significant amounts of water which may be scarce in arid regions, and being generally less durable than traditional asphalt.

=== Reflective pavements ===
The effectiveness of reflective cool pavements is dependent on their ability to reflect solar radiation or albedo. These pavements utilize reflective aggregates, advanced binders, and specialized coatings to increase solar reflectivity for reduced heat absorption, leading to lower surface and ambient temperatures. Common coatings used are clear resin, light-colored aggregates, and light-colored cement, all of which vary in their reflective abilities. Because they reduce temperature by reflecting sunlight, reflective pavements work to reduce surface temperatures only during the day. Cement plays an important role in enhancing concrete's reflective properties, with lighter shades improving solar reflection.

A 2024 study conducted on the pedestrian paths in Seoul, South Korean, found that high reflectivity pavement materials can reduce the surface temperature, but the increase reflection of solar radiation may have a negative impact on the thermal comfort of pedestrians.

=== Other types ===
Other types of pavements, known as 'heat storage modified pavements,' include energy-harvesting, high-conductive, and phase change material (PCM)-incorporated pavements. Energy-harvesting pavements harvest heat energy through the circulation of liquids, which can then be converted to electricity via thermoelectric generators. Additionally, photovoltaic cells can be used to convert sunlight into electrical energy. High-conductive pavements incorporate materials with high thermal conductivity to quickly transfer heat from the pavement surface to the soil below, which dissipates heat faster than the pavement material. In contrast, PCM-incorporated pavements utilize materials that absorb, store, and release heat as they transition from solid to liquid states. This process helps minimize extreme heat since it is a form of temperature regulation within pavement.

== Manufacturing ==
=== Evaporative pavements ===
Evaporative porous pavements can be manufactured by drilling vertical holes in standard interlocking concrete paver blocks and filling the holes with gravel. The holes increase the pavement's permeability and cooling properties by allowing water to accumulate. This increase is also achieved by mixing in aggregates covered with cement paste and asphalt binder before pavement is laid, which creates connected pores that hold water. Permeable and water-retaining pavements use a permeable material with pores grouted using blast furnace slag or pervious mortar to hold runoff water in a particular layer.

Evaporative pavements tend to have lower mechanical strength than other pavements due to their voids. Maintenance and replacement requirements are more frequent, as permeable pavements are more susceptible to water damage and raveling (pavement surface disintegration).

=== Reflective pavements ===
Reflective pavement manufacturing involves the application of a top coat onto finished pavement, or the mixing of reflective materials into wet concrete. Coating materials include water or solvent based coatings with high solar reflectance properties, infra-red colored coatings, and thermochromic materials which change color and optical properties based on ambient temperature. Mixed reflective additives include thermochromic additions to asphalt binder, heat reflective additives, and slag and fly ash in cement mixtures.

Reflective pavements are prone to pollution which significantly decreases their effectiveness over time. Maintenance on reflective pavements usually involves a surface coating or seal to compensate for surface wearing or damage over time. Chip seals use pneumatic rollers to embed aggregates into pavement surface; sand and scrub seals inject additives into pavement cracks and roll them in; and microsurfacing involves spraying a high-friction, high-reflective coating over the road surface. A field study published in 2026 found that the mean solar reflectivity of cool pavement at a site in north Phoenix decreased from 0.28 to 0.13 over 21 months. The same study found that much of the decline in solar reflectivity occurred within the first month after the coating was placed.

=== Other types ===
Energy-harvesting cool pavements circulate fluid through the pavement to capture thermal energy via convection. Fluid circulation is accomplished by embedding stainless steel, copper, or concrete pipes into the pavement and flowing air or water through the pipes. Other energy-harvesting pavement manufacturing methods involve embedding photovoltaic cells, bismuth telluride-based thermoelectric generators, or pyroelectric materials into the pavement. So far, energy-harvesting cool pavements have not been proven successful at handling heavy traffic, as the energy harvesting elements are prone to damage or decrease in efficiency after being subjected to road maintenance. Manufacturing technologies to improve the load-bearing capabilities of energy harvesting pavements are still being developed.

High-conductive cool pavements can be modified by adding materials with high thermal conductivity to asphalt. Materials include carbon or steel fiber, graphite, carbon black compound, steel slag, or reinforcing with metal rods.

PCM-incorporated cool pavements are made by encapsulating the phase change materials before mixing them into asphalt, as direct contact with PCM materials can negatively affect the pavement's mechanical strength and make it more fracture prone. PCM pavements are most commonly made via impregnation, where a porous material such as shale or clay is filled with and immersed in the PCM. The porous material is then covered with cement before being mixed into the concrete or asphalt that makes up the pavement. Encapsulation can also be accomplished by covering the PCM with a metal shell before mixing into asphalt.

== Safety implications ==
Cool pavement improves the road's permeability, increasing the safety of drivers during wet seasons. The porous composition of evaporative cool pavement allows water to penetrate through the road, which can increase tire traction and reduce water spray. In addition, cool pavements can decrease tire noise by up to eight decibels and lower traffic noise levels to 75 dB.

Reflective cool pavements can also increase visibility at night, reducing the need for streetlights which makes streets safer and also limits energy consumption. However, the enhanced albedo of the road can also reflect more light into drivers' eyes, creating a high glare that can impact visibility. To combat this, anti-glare coatings can be incorporated into the road.

Additionally, sunlight and high temperatures accelerate the production of ground-level ozone (smog), which is detrimental to humans and animals. At least one out of three people in the United States experiences ozone health-related issues such as an irritated respiratory system, asthma, and a weakened immune system. Cool pavements can combat this as increased albedo and reduced temperatures prevent nitrous oxides and volatile organic hydrocarbon gases from reacting and creating ozone.

== Societal implications ==
Installing cool pavements in urban heat islands can combat thermal inequity (unequal distribution of heat in urban areas) which disproportionately impacts minorities and low-income individuals. These communities often lack the necessary resources to adapt to high temperatures. During warm seasons, urban areas can reach temperatures that are 2-8 °F hotter, but cool pavements decrease surface and air temperatures by increasing the albedo of roads, improving comfort.

== Environmental impact ==
Cool pavements can reduce local temperatures, leading to lower energy demands as air conditioners require less power to cool buildings. For instance, increasing pavement reflectivity (albedo) in Los Angeles has been estimated to save over $90 million annually in energy costs.

Lower energy use translates to reduced greenhouse emissions and air pollution, depending on the fuel sources powering local grids. Cooler temperatures can also slow down smog-producing chemical reactions, contributing to cleaner air. In 2007, researchers estimated that if global pavement albedo increased by 35 to 39 percent, it could lead to carbon dioxide reductions valued at approximately $400 billion.

In 2022, a project installed over 700,000 square feet of reflective pavement in Pacoima, California, a city in Los Angeles County known for its high summer temperatures. This project examined how cool pavements affect the local microclimate, assessing changes in surface and air temperatures, pedestrian comfort, and issues like glare and air quality. On regular hot summer days, the average air temperature dropped by 0.2 °C to 1.2 °C, while surface temperatures were lower by 2.6 °C to 4.9 °C. Results suggest that cool pavements can enhance comfort for pedestrians, with mean radiant temperature reductions between 0.9 °C and 1.3 °C, and physiologically equivalent temperature decreases from 0.2 °C to 1.7 °C.

== See also ==
- Whitetopping
- Permeable pavement
- Solar mirror
