= Whitetopping =

Road surface treatment

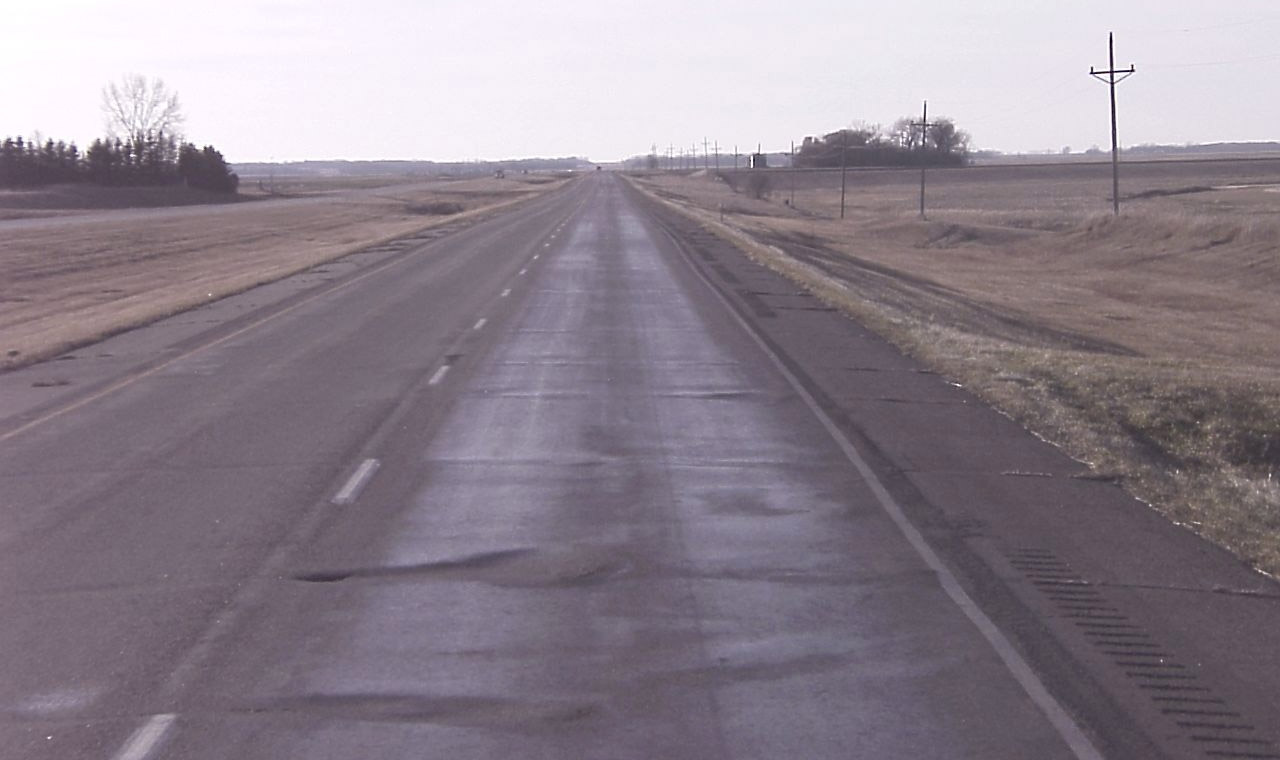
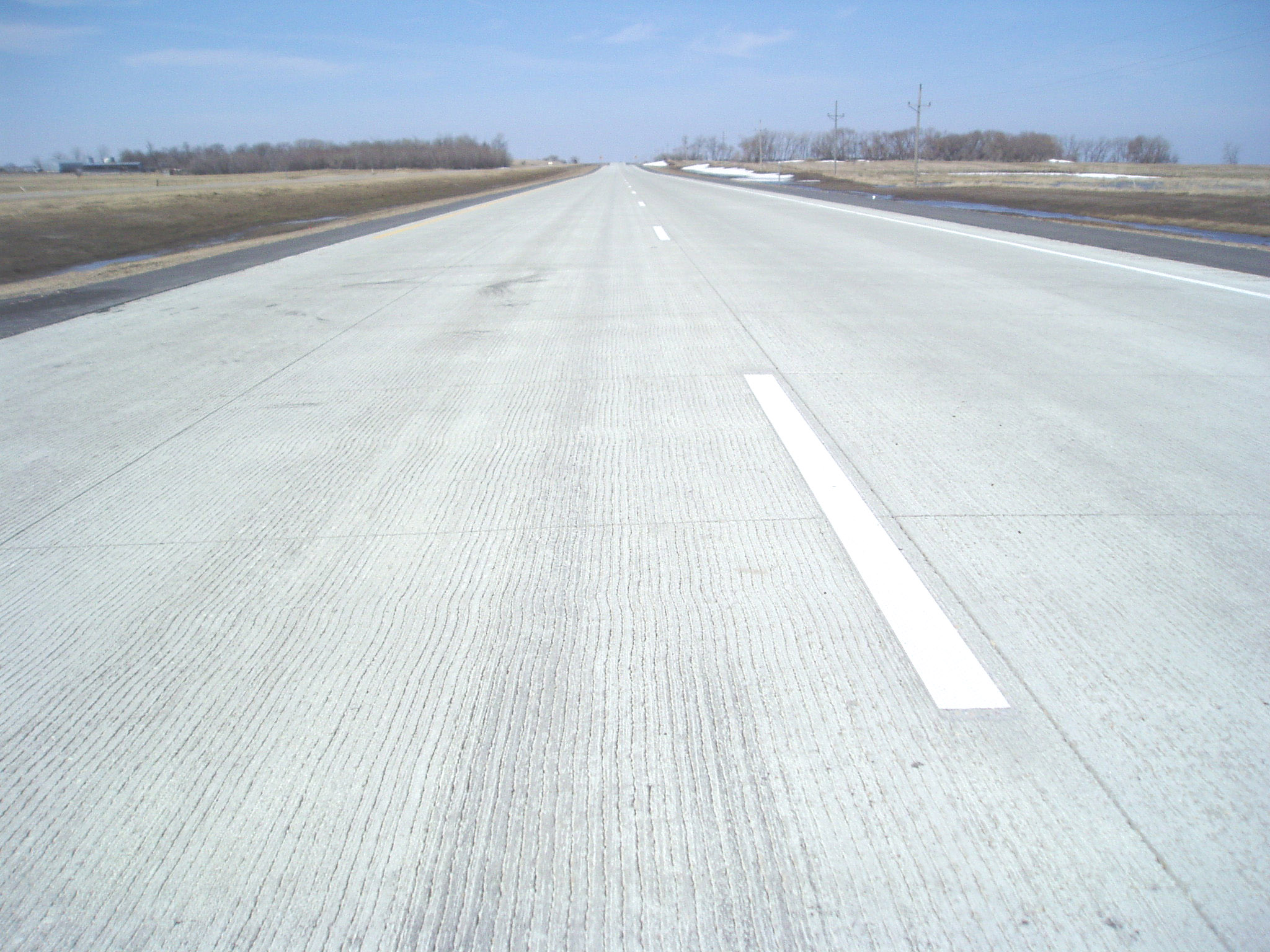
Road before (left) with asphalt concrete and after (right) whitetopping with cement concrete

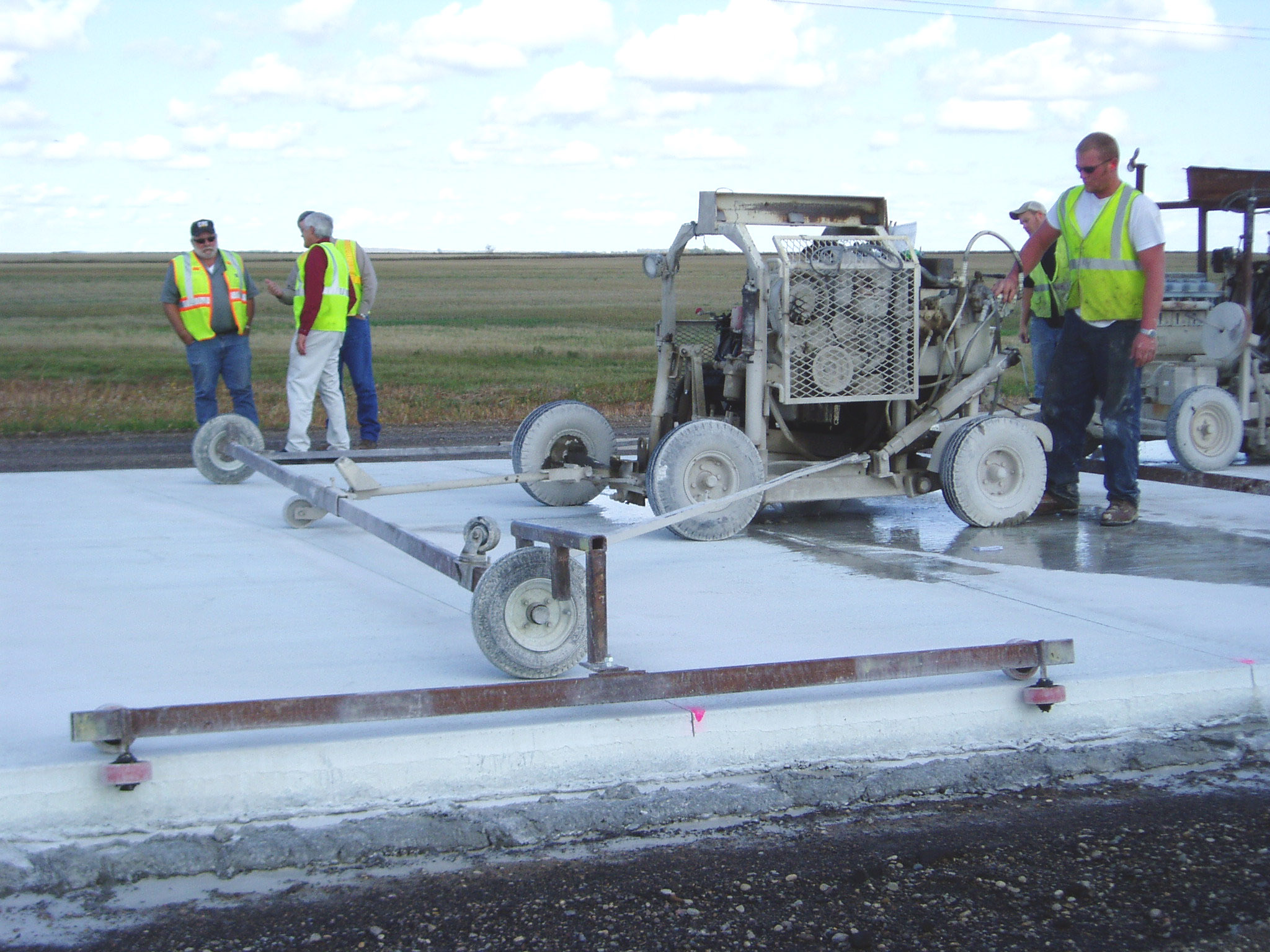
Whitetopping process

Whitetopping is the covering of an existing asphalt pavement with a layer of Portland cement concrete. Whitetopping is divided into types depending on the thickness of the concrete layer and whether the layer is bonded to the asphalt substrate. Unbonded whitetopping, also called conventional whitetopping, uses concrete thicknesses of 20cm (8") or more that is not bonded to the asphalt. Bonded whitetopping uses thicknesses of 5 to 15cm (2-6") bonded to the asphalt pavement and is divided into two types, thin and ultrathin. The bond is made by texturing the asphalt. Thin whitetopping uses a bonded layer of concrete that is 10 - 15cm (4-6") thick while an ultrathin layer is 5 to 10 cm (2-4") thick. Ultrathin whitetopping is suitable for light duty uses, such as roads with low traffic volume, parking lots and small airports. Fiber reinforced concrete is used in some thin whitetopping overlays and almost all ultrathin whitetopping overlays.

Whitetopping is suitable for asphalt pavement with little deterioration, although repairs can be made to the asphalt if necessary. If the pavement is badly damaged, it should be completely removed and a new concrete pavement should be installed. The pavement should be relatively hard, as well. Deterioration of overlays is significantly increased on asphalt bases with high viscosity. If a grade or a distance between the pavement and a bridge needs to be preserved, the asphalt can be milled so that the height of the pavement does not change. However, whitetopping requires the asphalt layer to be at least 7.5cm (3") thick. If necessary, a section of new concrete roadway can be placed under a bridge with gentle slopes on either side that meet up with the whitetopped portions of the road.

== History and development ==
The practice of resurfacing distressed asphalt pavements with Portland cement concrete overlays—later termed whitetopping—emerged in the United States during the mid‑20th century as transportation agencies sought longer‑lasting rehabilitation methods than conventional asphalt overlays.

By the 1980s and 1990s, research sponsored by the Federal Highway Administration, FHWA and state departments of transportation refined design methods and construction practices. These studies demonstrated that thinner concrete overlays, when properly bonded to the asphalt substrate, could provide durable and cost‑effective service. This led to the classification of thin and ultrathin whitetopping (UTW), with thicknesses ranging from 5 to 15 cm, suitable for urban streets, intersections, and parking facilities.

Minnesota and Colorado became early leaders in field implementation. The Minnesota Road Research Facility, MnROAD constructed test sections in the 1990s to evaluate bonded overlays under varying traffic and climate conditions, producing influential performance data that guided national specifications. Similarly, Colorado’s “thin whitetopping” projects provided some of the first large‑scale demonstrations of bonded overlays on high‑volume roads, showing significant improvements in rutting resistance and surface durability.

International adoption followed in the late 20th and early 21st centuries, with agencies in Europe and Asia incorporating whitetopping into pavement management strategies. Studies highlighted its potential for extending pavement life cycles, reducing maintenance frequency, and lowering long‑term costs compared with repeated asphalt overlays. Today, whitetopping is recognized as a mainstream rehabilitation technique, with ongoing research focusing on optimizing panel size, fiber reinforcement, and sustainable construction practices.

== Benefits ==
As a durable, low-maintenance alternative to asphalt concrete (AC) overlays, whitetopping normally requires less maintenance over its lifespan. Less maintenance on the roads would then result in fewer traffic disruptions that would be caused by replacing or repairing the road surface. From the cost perspective, whitetopping is often recommended as a competitive option to asphalt concrete overlays. A life-cycle cost (LCC) analysis conducted by the Colorado Department of Transportation, which included the user costs, found that the thin whitetopping (TWT) option was 11% less expensive than the asphalt concrete overlay option.

== See also ==
- Cool pavement
