= Angle grinder =

Handheld power tool for cutting or polishing

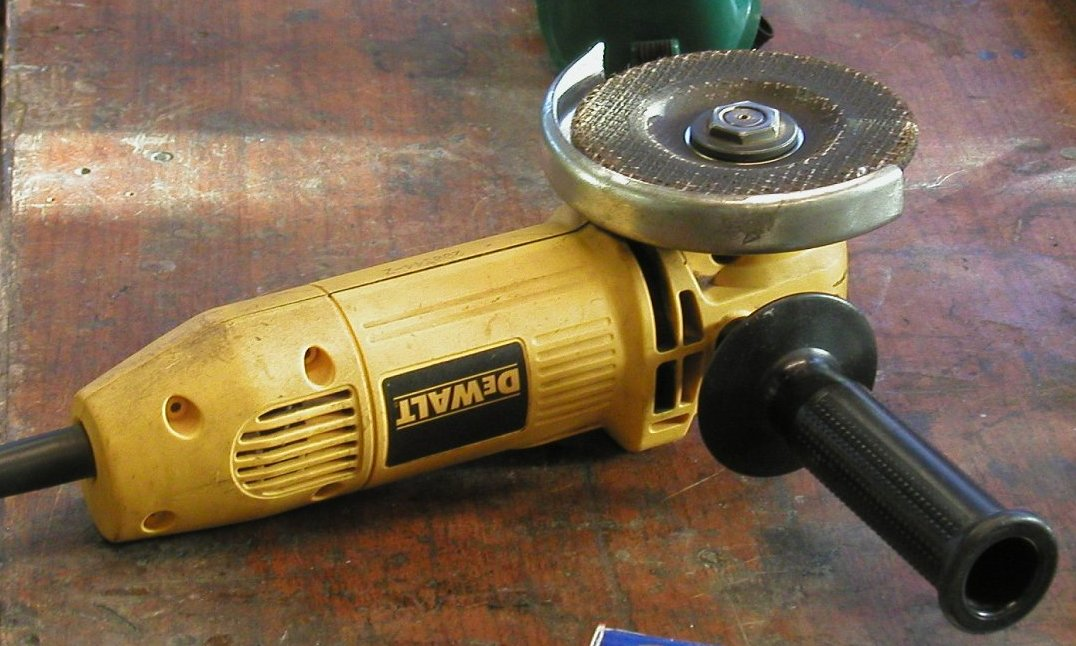
Angle grinder

An angle grinder, also known as a side grinder or disc grinder, is a handheld power tool used for grinding (abrasive cutting), polishing, sanding, and similar applications. Its use is especially prevalent in metalwork.

== History ==
The high-speed angle grinder was invented in 1954 by German company Ackermann + Schmitt (FLEX-Elektrowerkzeuge GmbH) in Steinheim an der Murr. Before the high speed angle grinder of 1954, many other inventors from the early 20th century had produced grinders and similar cutting tools for use in metalwork. As electric power tools became more available and affordable, the prevalence of angle grinders in workshops increased, and they also became a popular DIY tool, especially after the invention of battery-powered cordless angle grinders.

== Naming ==
In German, Dutch, Slovak, Czech, Polish, Croatian, Romanian, Hungarian, Bulgarian and Latvian, an angle grinder is colloquially called a "flex", and in Italy and in Spanish-speaking countries it is sometimes called "flexible". This originates with Ackermann + Schmitt's use of a flexibile shaft between the motor drive and the tool. The name "flex" proved so enduring that Ackermann + Schmitt changed their company's name to FLEX.

In Switzerland it is known as "Perles" from a popular brand of cutting tools. In Finnish, angle grinders are colloquially known as "rälläkkä", an onomatopoeia for the distinctive sound they make when cutting (the Estonian name "relakas" comes from the Finnish name). In Polish it is also known as "kątówka" or "gumówka" (literally "rubber thing"), which refers to the elasticity of certain types of disks (however these are never made out of true rubber due to fire hazard). In Russian, the tool is known as "болгарка" ("bolgarka") (literally "Bulgarian" of the feminine gender), since the first angle grinders in the USSR were Bulgarian-made.

Angle grinders are sometimes confused with cut-off saws, though these have less variable applications.

== Design ==
Angle grinders can be powered by an electric motor or compressed air. The motor drives a geared head at a right-angle, on which is a spindle for mounting discs. The nature of these discs varies based on their intended use. Abrasive disc or thinner cut-off discs are the most common, and both can be replaced when worn. Angle grinders typically have an adjustable guard and a side-handle for two-handed operation. Many modern brands of angle grinders have a two-stage constant pressure trigger switch (also known as a "deadman's switch") to prevent the user accidentally switching the tool on, especially when changing discs.

Depending on their speed range, angle grinders can be used as sanders, employing a sanding disc with a backing pad or disc. The backing system is typically made of hard plastic, phenolic resin, or medium-hard rubber, depending on the amount of flexibility desired. Wheels are most often added or removed using an angle grinder wrench, a distinctive two-pin spanner used to attach discs to the grinder's spindle.

== Uses ==
Although developed originally as tools for rigid abrasive discs, the availability of an interchangeable power source has encouraged their use with a wide variety of cutters and attachments.

Angle grinders are used in metal fabrication shops, on construction sites and in machine shops, along with die grinders and bench grinders.

There are different discs for different tasks, cut-off discs (diamond blade), abrasive grinding discs, grinding stones, sanding discs, wire brush wheels and polishing pads. Typically, cut-off discs are disposable and will be discarded once they are worn down. Angle grinders have large bearings to counter the side forces generated, unlike a power drill, where the force is axial. This versatility give angle grinders a wide variety of uses, including cutting, sanding, grinding, demolition, polishing, and stripping. Though they can be used on other materials, they are predominantly used on metal and masonry.

Angle grinders are widely used in metalworking, construction, emergency rescue, and the theft of bicycles, and can be found in workshops, service garages and auto body repair shops. There are a large variety of angle grinders with different disc sizes and power sources: battery, corded or pneumatic. Other variables include the motor power and speed, rpm, and arbor size. Generally, disc size and power increase together. Disc size is usually measured in inches or millimetres. Common disc sizes for angle grinders in the United States include 4, 4.5, 5, 6, 7, 9 and 12 inches, with the most popular sizes being the 4.5 and 5" size. Outside North America, the most common sizes for angle grinder discs are 115 and 125 millimetres.

Discs for pneumatic grinders are much smaller, and pneumatic grinders tend to be used for lighter-duty jobs in which more precision is required. This is because pneumatic grinders can be powerful while being small and light, because they do not contain heavy copper motor windings. It is harder for an electric grinder to maintain adequate power with smaller size. Electric grinders are more commonly used for larger, heavy duty jobs. However, there are also small electric grinders and large pneumatic grinders.

Angle grinders have also been used to remove wheel clamps from vehicles.

== Safety and health ==
Video: An angle grinder is used for cutting through a steel chain, kept under tension by a second person to avoid impeding the wheel of the grinder. Large amounts of potentially harmful particulates (metal dust) are being generated.

A video on vibration research done on pneumatic grinders

Use of angle grinder can emit a large amount of small respirable dust. Excessive dust emission is regulated by air pollution laws and violation can result in fines. Proper use of well-designed dust collectors (e.g. dust collection hoods) can reduce dust concentration significantly (up to 80-90%).

The disc type (fibre disc or grinding wheel) affects the dust's size distribution. The dust emitted can be as small as PM1.

Angle grinders can produce considerable volumes of harmful sparks, fumes and particulates, especially when compared to using a reciprocating saw or band saw. Angle grinders produce sparks when cutting ferrous metals, and can also produce shards when cutting other materials. The blades themselves may break, which is a hazard to the face and eyes especially, as well as other parts of the body - in these instances debris moving at high speed may cause penetrating injuries.

A grinder disc becoming lodged or jammed can cause kickback, a dangerous phenomenon where the tool will jump or thrust back towards the user. Consequently, a full face shield and other protective clothing such as cut resistant gloves must be worn at all times. Cutting discs often have arrows or marking specifying which direction they should be used in, and it is recommended to adjust the guard so sparks fly away from the angle grinder operator. Sparks can also make angle grinders a fire hazard, especially in enclosed spaces.

Angle grinders should never be used without their guard attached and the handle should only be removed if absolutely necessary. All workpieces should be securely clamped or held firmly in a vise. In a sound pressure level and vibration study conducted by the US National Institute for Occupational Safety and Health, grinders under an unloaded condition created noise which ranged from 91 to 103 dBA.

== Gallery ==
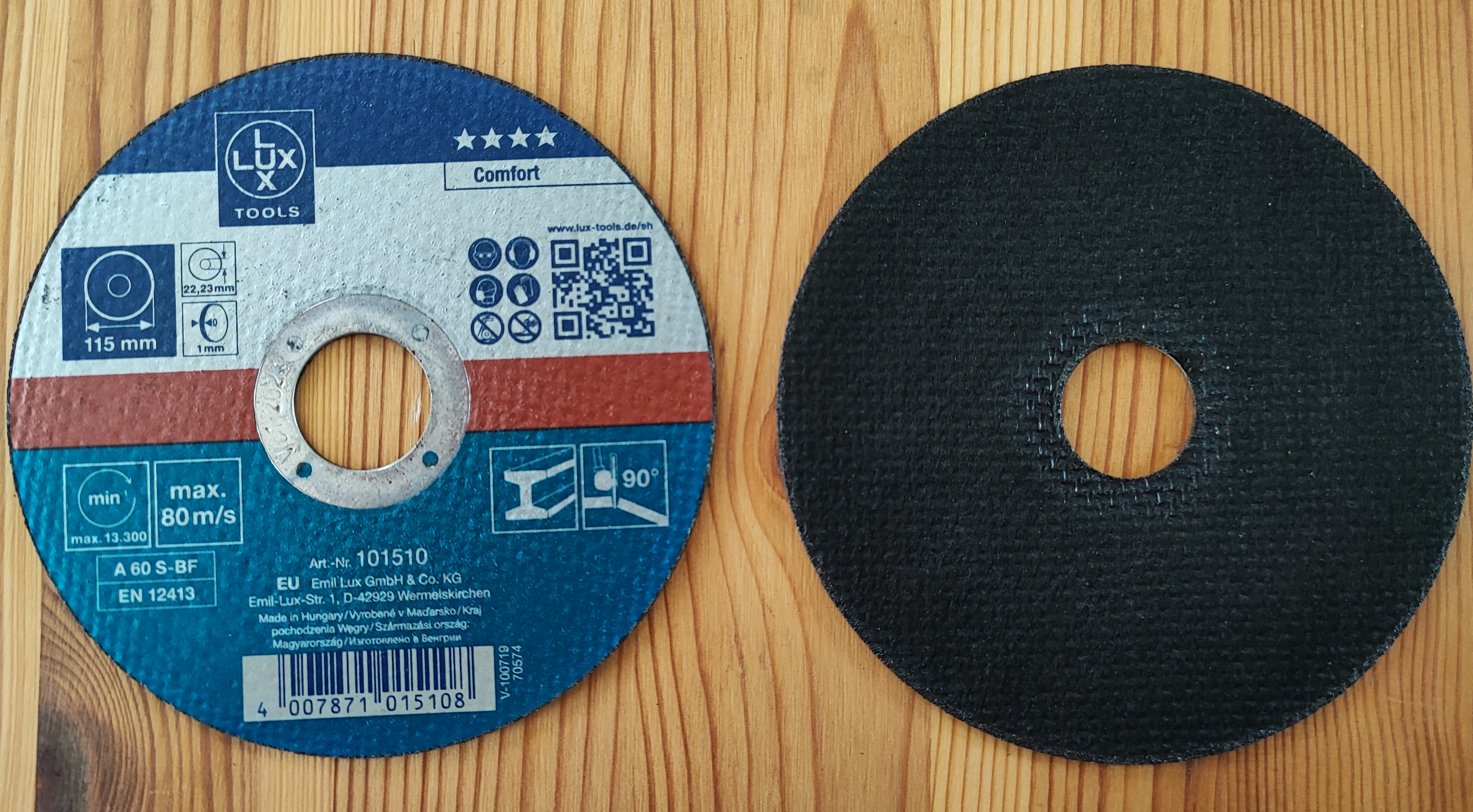
Cut-off wheel

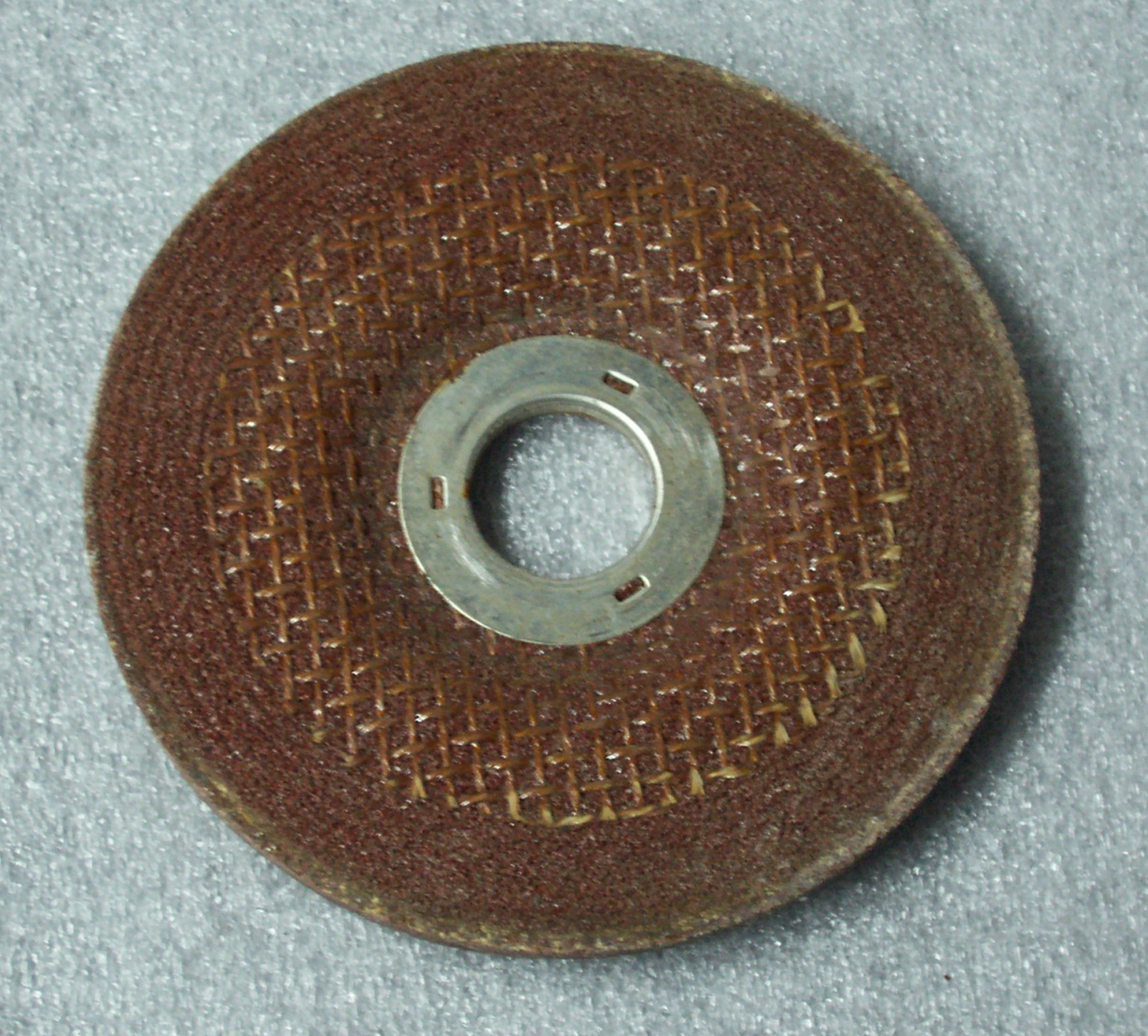
Grinding wheel for grinding

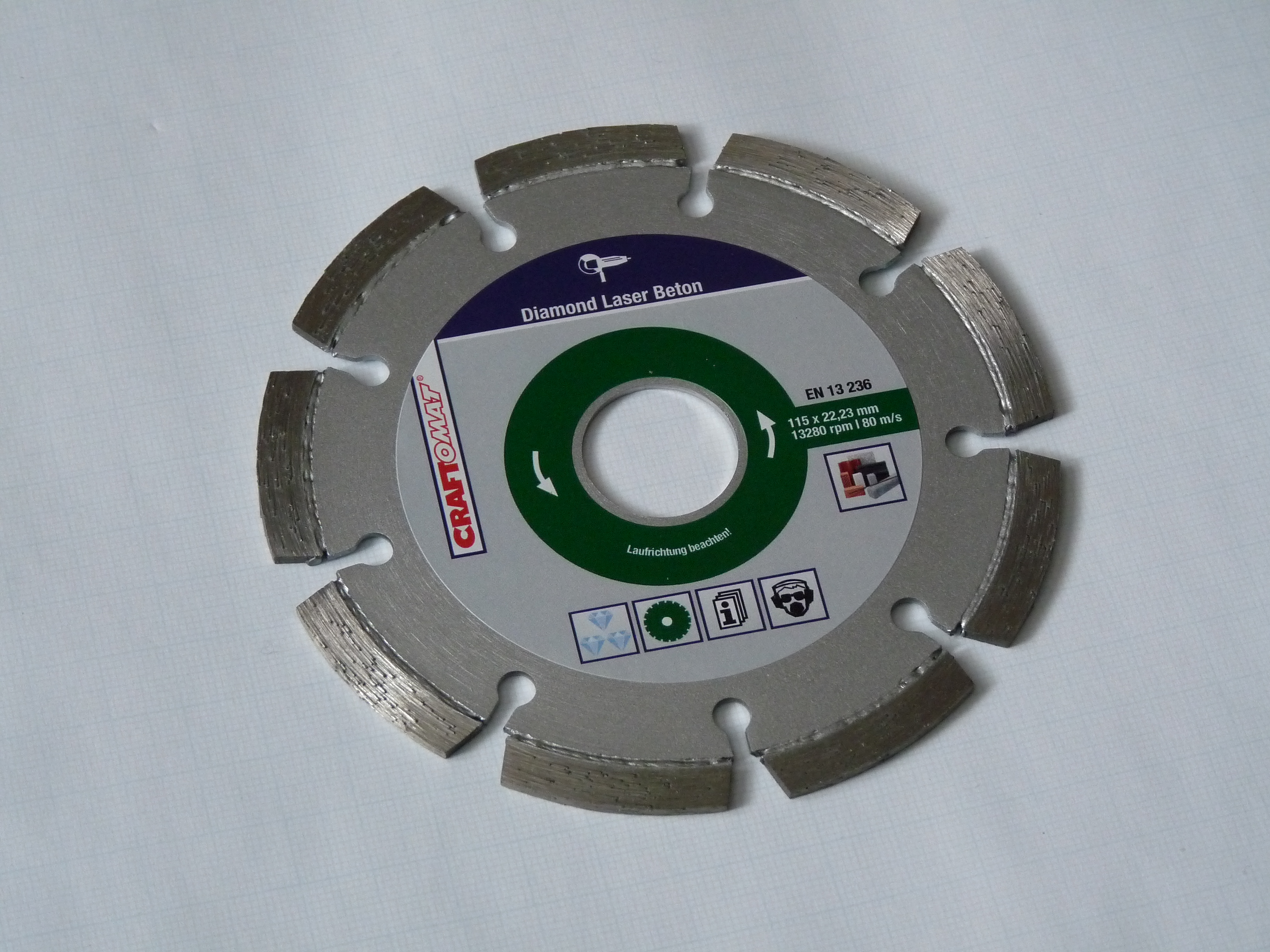
Diamond disc or diamond cutting wheel, for cutting stones like granite

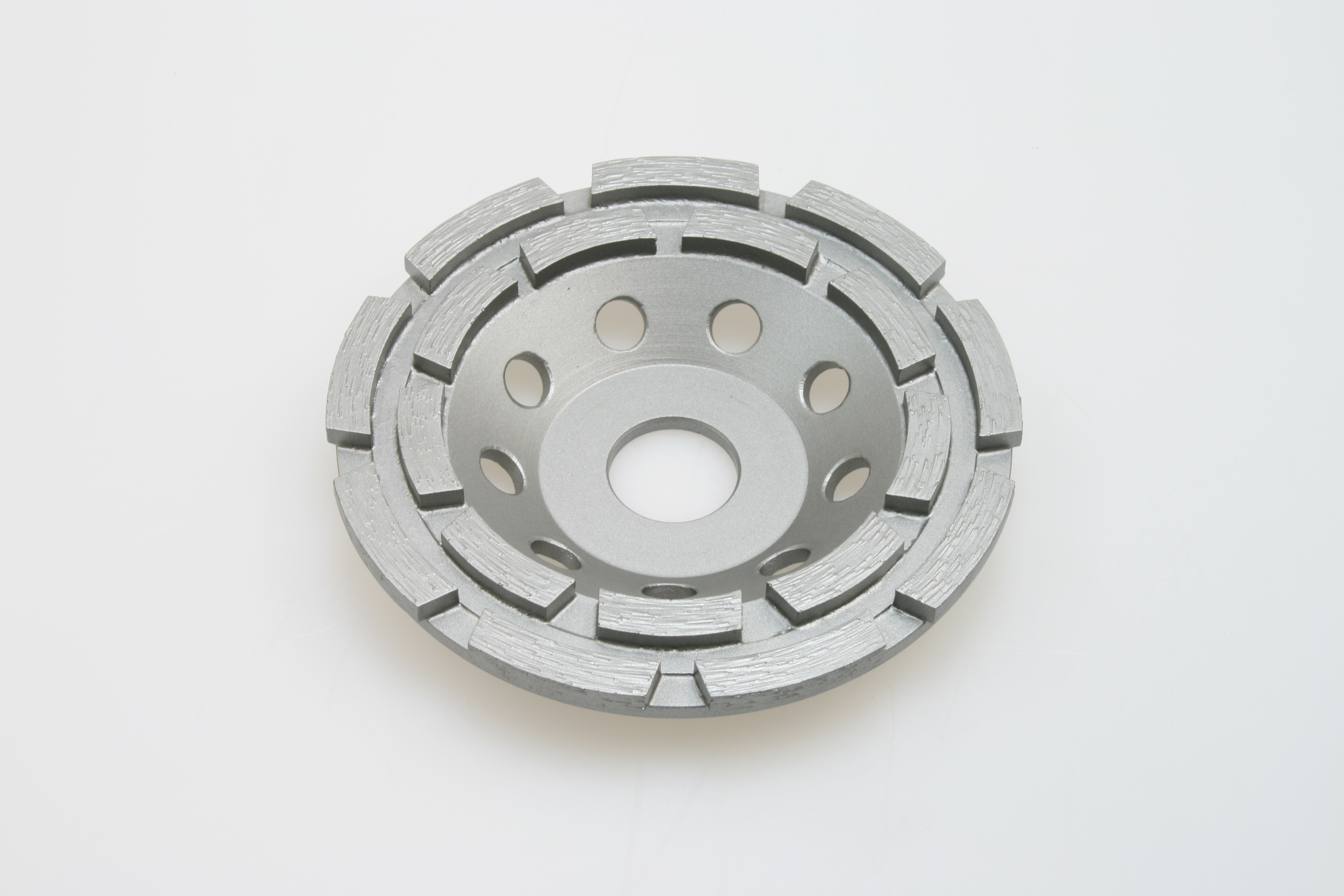
Concrete grinding wheel, to remove concrete from surface or polish concrete entirely

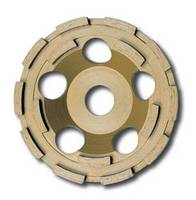
Diamond grinding disc for flat surfacing of stonework

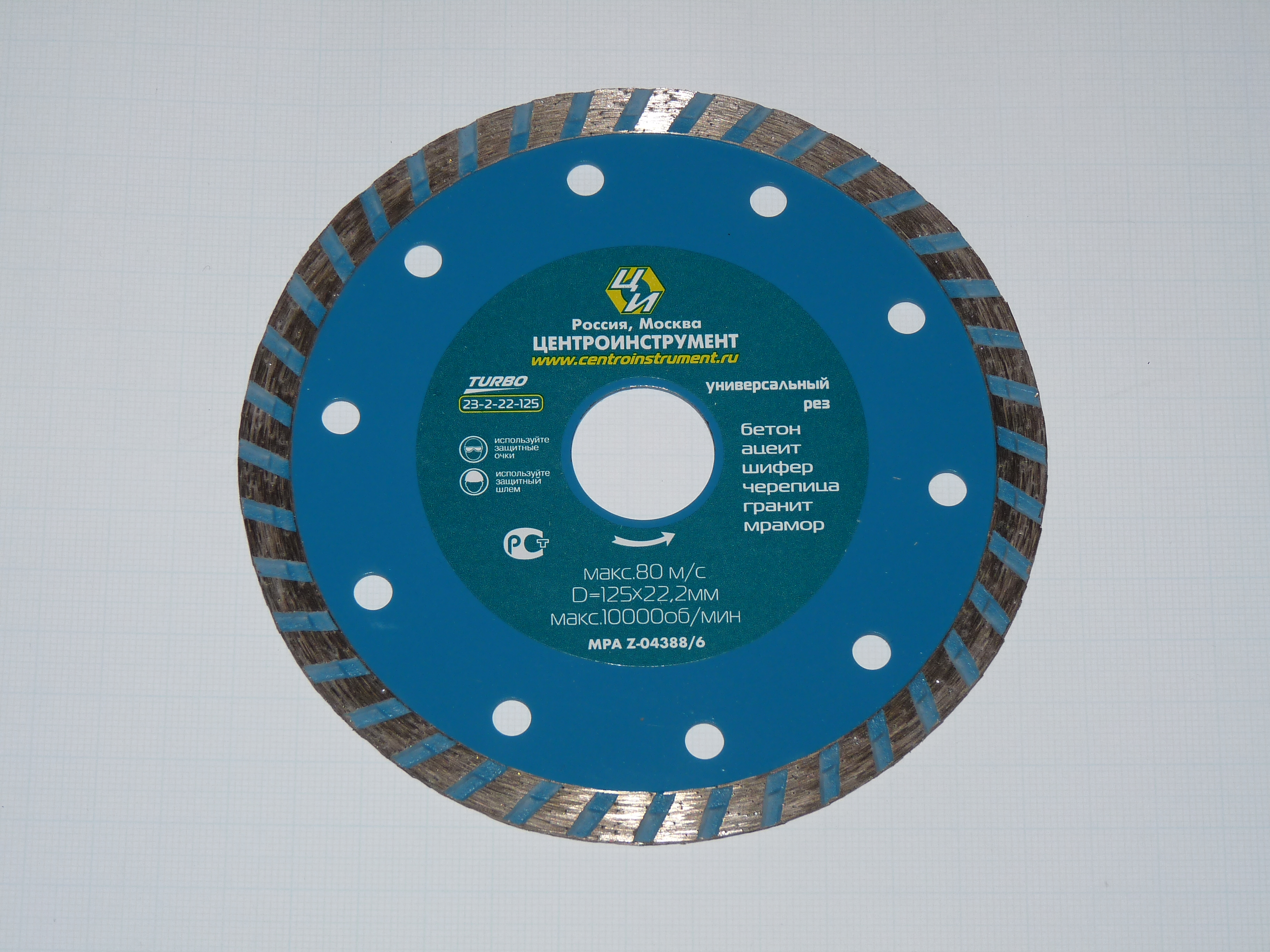

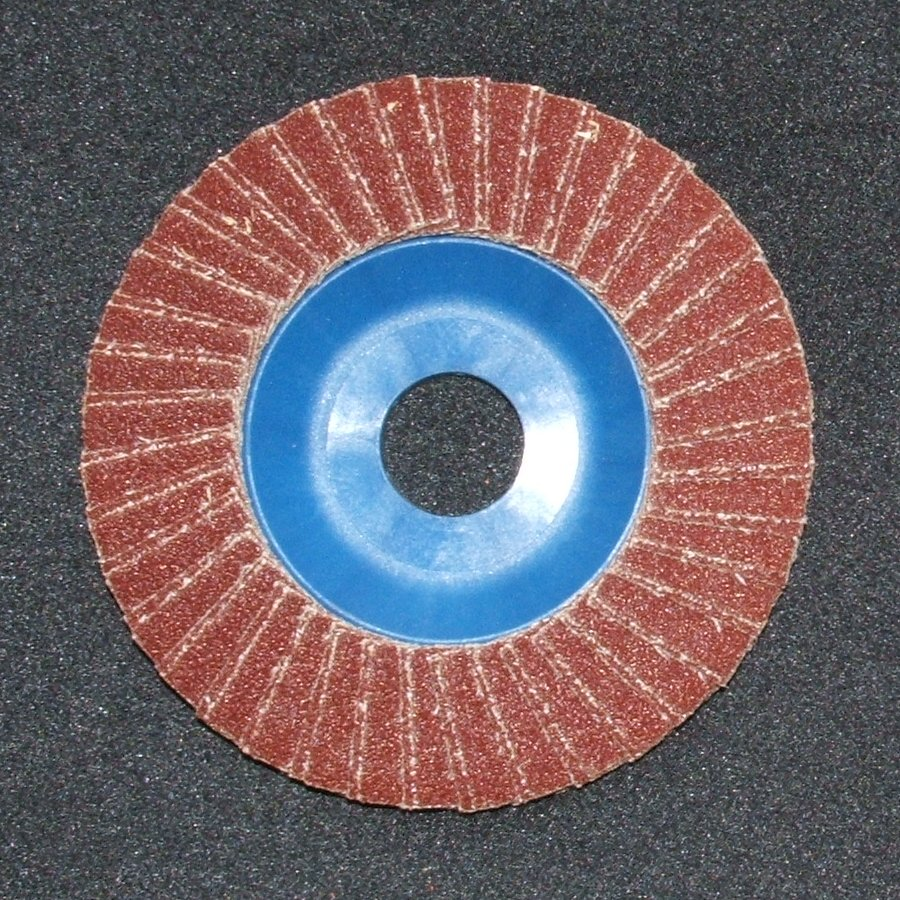
Flap disk. It is rough and made of sandpaper for sanding surfaces such as iron and wood

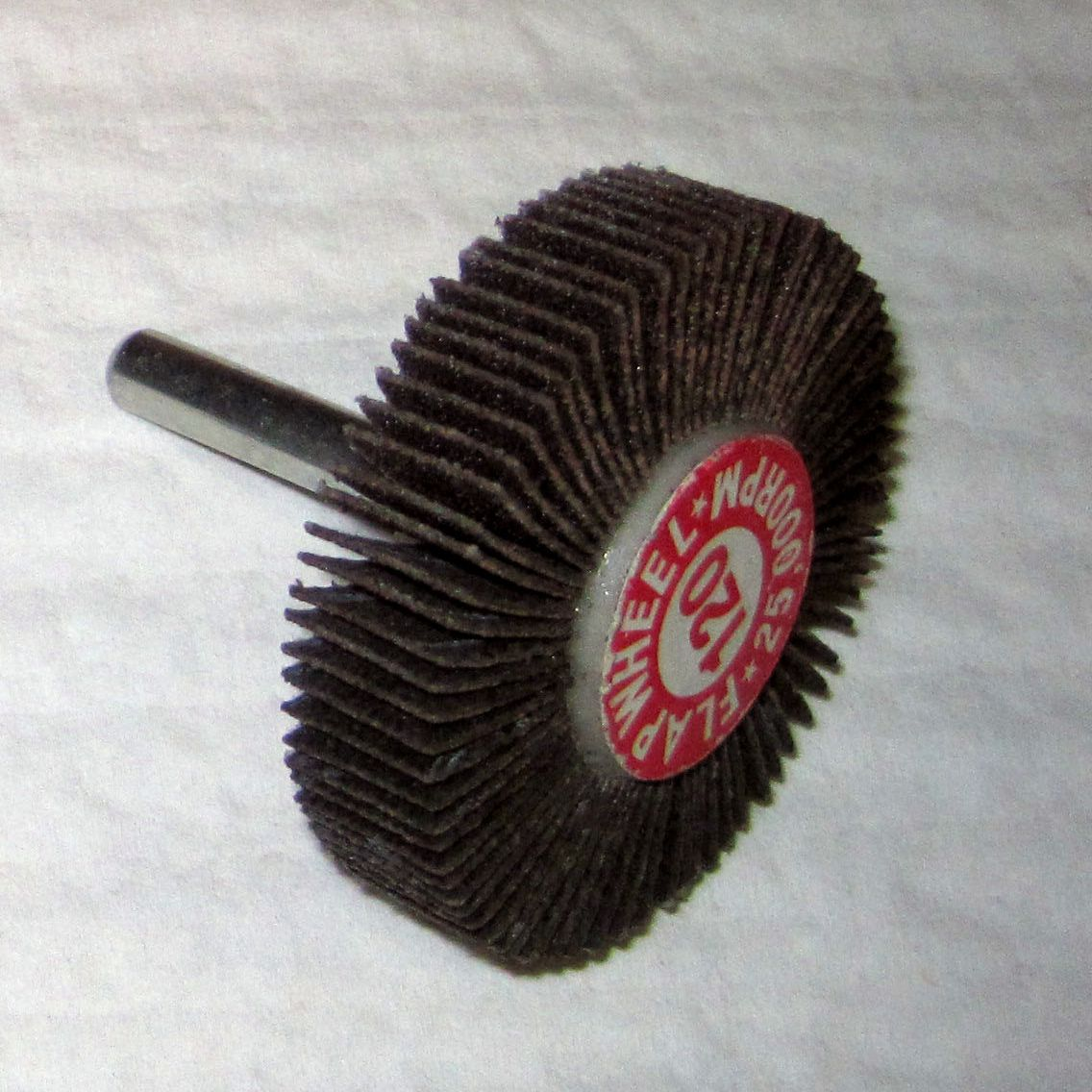
Flapwheel for cleaning, polishing, grinding, and deburring

== See also ==
- Disc cutter
- Abrasive saw
- Sander
- Health impacts of sawdust
- Diamond grinding cup wheel
- Flapwheel
