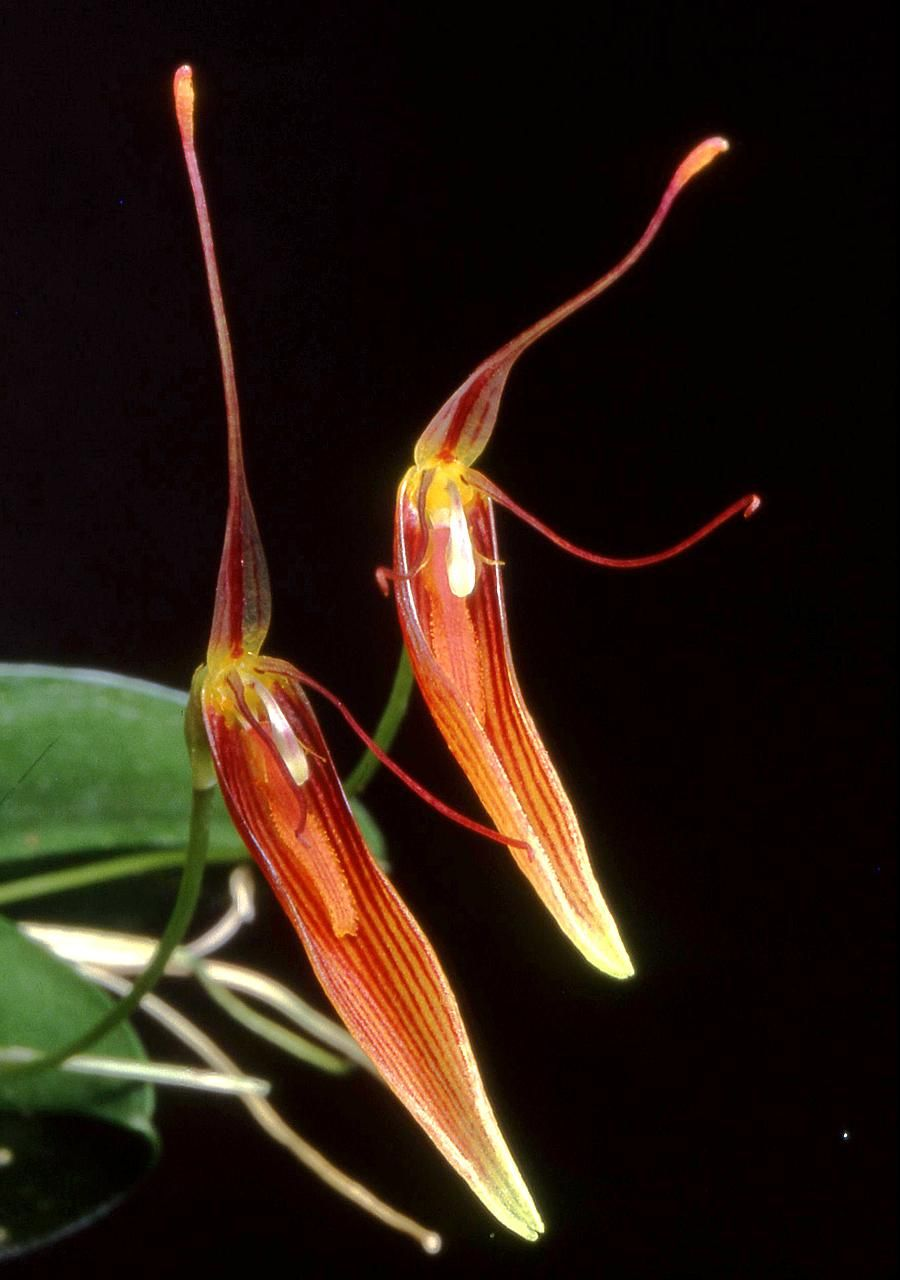
- Flower of Restrepia trichoglossa

Scientific classification
- Kingdom: Plantae
- Clade: Tracheophytes
- Clade: Angiosperms
- Clade: Monocots
- Order: Asparagales
- Family: Orchidaceae
- Subfamily: Epidendroideae
- Genus: Restrepia
- Species: R. trichoglossa

Binomial name
- Restrepia trichoglossa F.Lehm. ex Sander

Synonyms
- Restrepia leontoglossa Schltr.; Restrepia serrilabia Schltr.; Restrepia subserrata Schltr.; Restrepia angustilabia Schltr.; Restrepia filamentosa Ames & C.Schweinf.; Restrepia lankesteri Ames & C. Schweinf.; Pleurothallis subserrata (Schltr.) L.O.Williams; Pleurothallis amesiana L.O. Williams; Pleurothallis filamentosa (Ames & C.Schweinf.) L.O.Williams; Restrepia angustilabia ssp. subserrata (Schltr.) H.Mohr; Restrepia antennifera ssp. leontoglossa (Schltr.) H.Mohr; Restrepia brachypus ssp. serrilabia (Schltr.) H.Mohr

= Restrepia trichoglossa =

Species of plant

Restrepia trichoglossa, commonly called the hairy-tongued restrepia, is a species of orchid found from Mexico (Chiapas) to Peru.
