= Belt sander =

Power tool

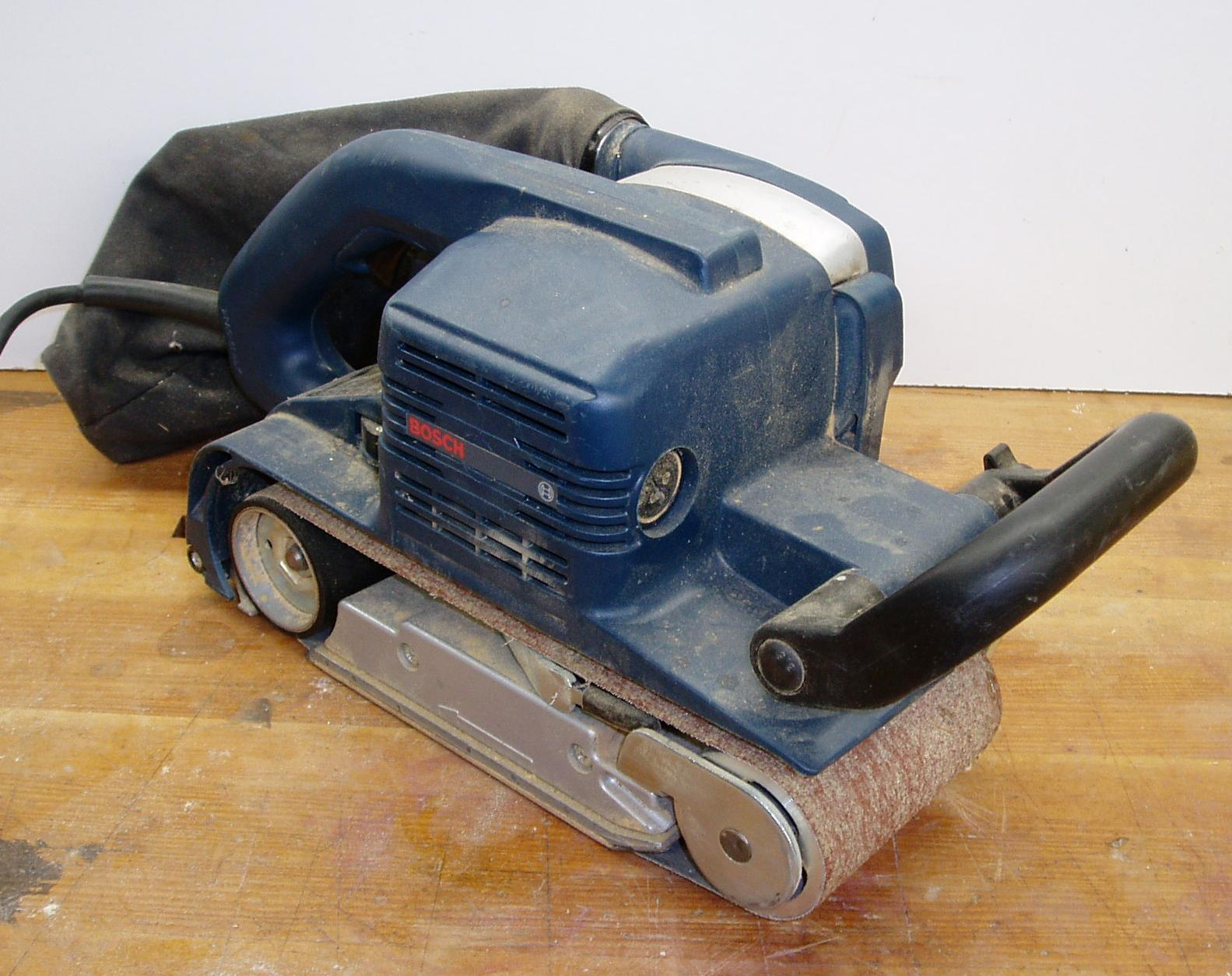
Hand-held belt sander

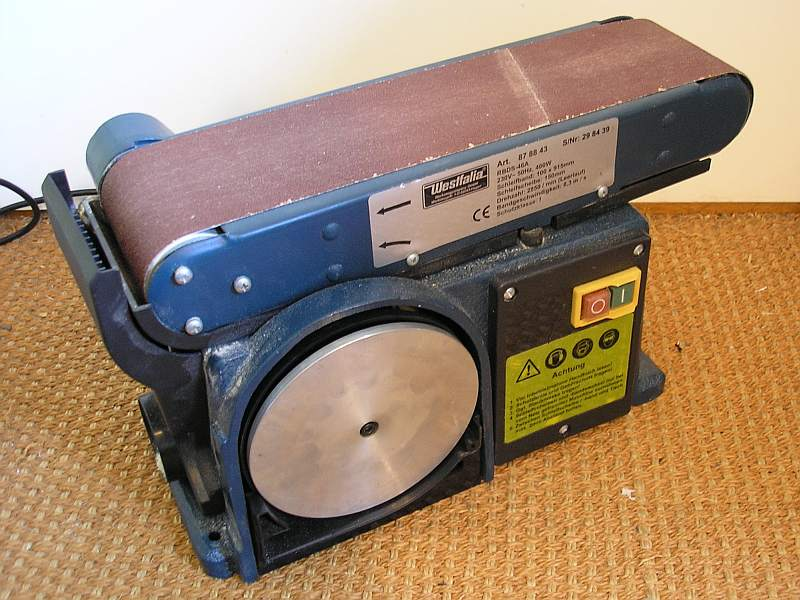
Stationary belt sander

A belt sander or strip sander is a sander used in shaping and finishing wood and other materials. It consists of an electric motor that turns a pair of drums on which a continuous loop of sandpaper is mounted. Belt sanders may be handheld and moved over the material, or stationary (fixed), where the material is moved to the sanding belt. Stationary belt sanders are sometimes mounted on a work bench, in which case they are called bench sanders. Stationary belt sanders are often combined with a disc sander.

Belt sanders can have a very aggressive action on wood and are normally used only for the beginning stages of the sanding process, or used to rapidly remove material. Sometimes they are also used for removing paints or finishes from wood. Fitted with fine grit sand paper, a belt sander can be used to achieve a completely smooth surface.

Stationary belt sanders are used for removing non-ferrous metals, such as aluminum. Non-ferrous metals tend to clog grinding wheels, quickly making them useless for grinding soft metals. Because the small grooves in the sandpaper are opened up as they go around the arc of the drive wheel, belt sanders are less prone to clogging.

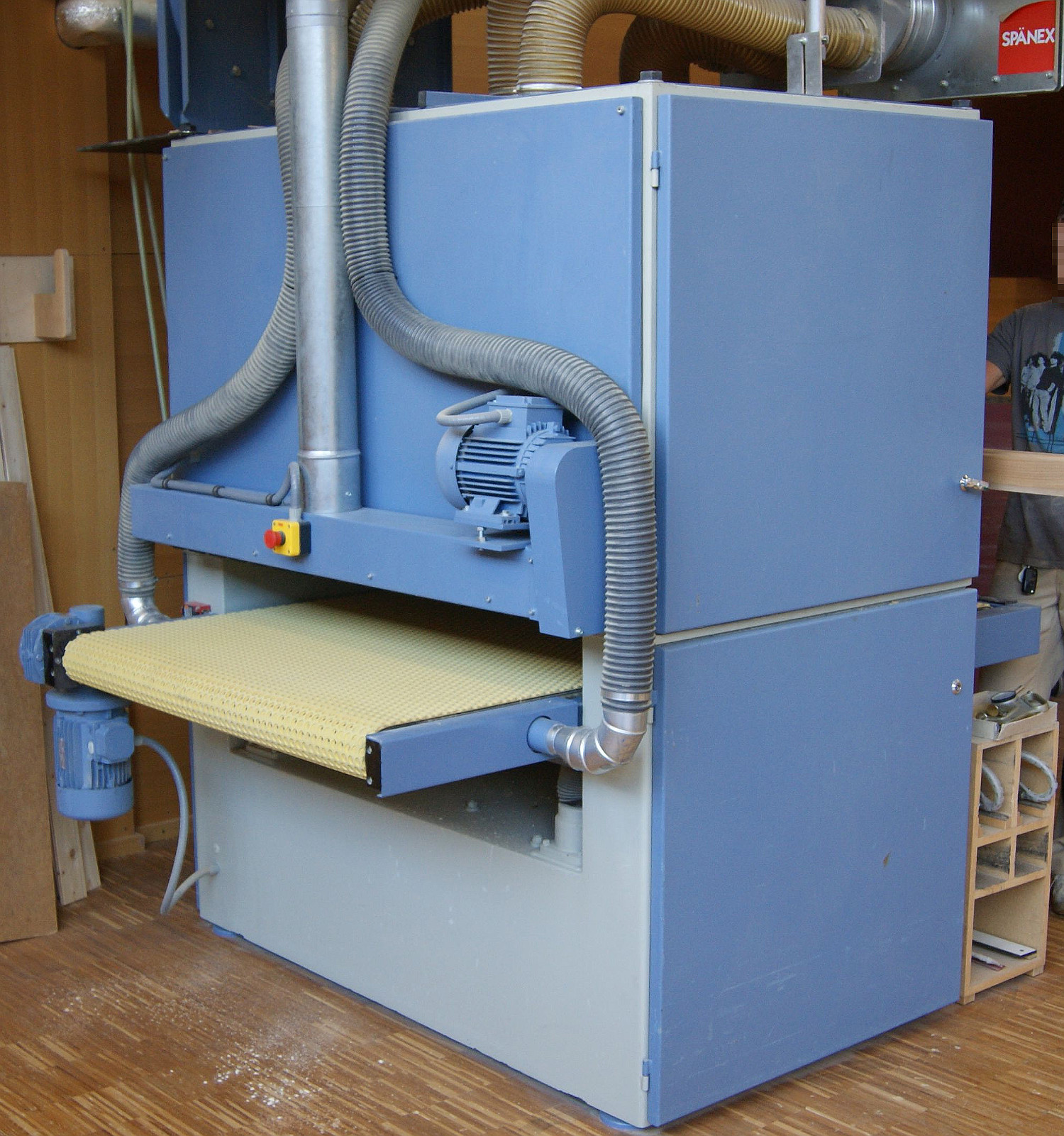

Belt sanders can vary in size from the small handheld unit shown in the illustration to units wide enough to sand a full 1.2 by 2.5 m (4-by-8 foot sheet) of plywood in a manufacturing plant. Some belt sanders can be as large as 1.2 by 0.7 metres (3 ft 11 in × 2 ft 4 in), as in photo. Sanding wood produces a large amount of sawdust. Therefore, belt sanders employed in woodworking are usually equipped with some type of dust collection system. It may be as simple as a cloth filter bag attached to a portable sander or a large vacuum system to suck dust particles away into a central collector.

Taut-belt sanders allow for adjusting the angle of the idler drum to keep the belt centered. Slack-belt sanding is commonly used in the manufacturing process of guitars and other medium-sized wooden objects. It employs a long sanding belt which runs slackly over the object. The machinist then exerts pressure to it to sand down specific areas.

== Racing ==
Belt sanders were one of the first power tools used in the growing field of power tool drag racing wherein a pair of stock or modified belt sanders are placed in parallel wooden channels and fitted with long extension cords. Each race begins when a common switch or individual switches triggered by the racers energizes them, causing the sanders to race towards the end of the track spitting wood dust along the way. Stock sanders race down a 15 metres (49 ft) track, while modified sanders race on a 25 metres (82 ft) track. Sanders of all shapes and sizes can go very fast or very slow, depending on the power of the motor. For example, some can go as fast as 8 km/h (5 mph) etc.

== Wide belt sander ==
A wide belt sander is used to machine stock flat and to specific thicknesses. It consists of sanding heads, contact drums and a conveyor belt. The sander is electric powered but relies on air pressure to control the abrasive belt. A rubber conveyor carries the stock through the machine while a wide abrasive belt removes material from the top surface. It is sometimes used in conjunction with the jointer to create square and true stock.

This type of sander has applications in woodworking and furniture production. It does fine sanding using rigid sanding pads and air cushion pads, cross and diagonal sanding as well as lacquer sanding.
