= Flapwheel =

Abrasive disk used for metal finishing

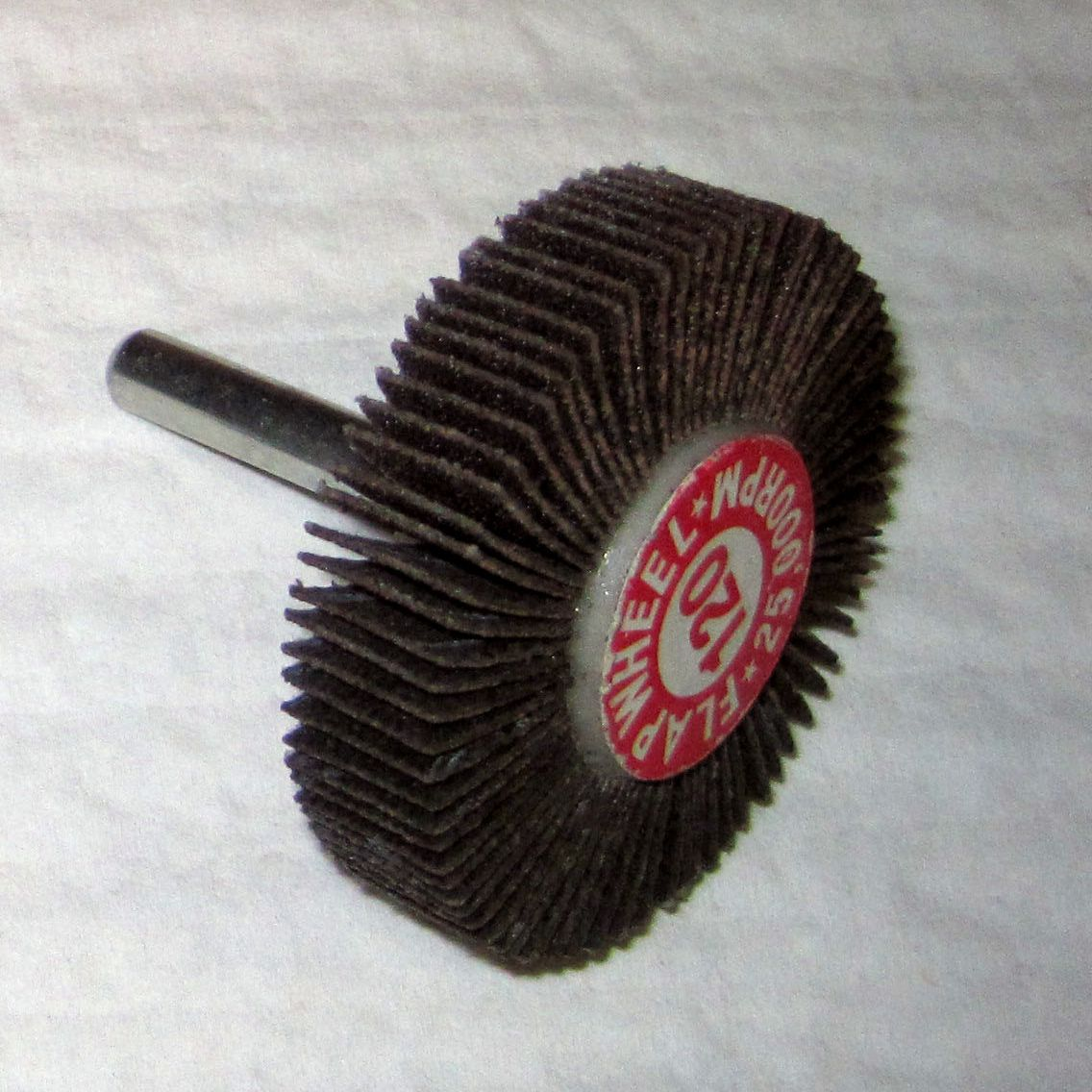
Early radial flapwheel, for use with an electric drill

A flapwheel and the related flap disk is an abrasive disk, used for metal finishing. Unlike the simpler flat disks, made from a circular flat sheet of a coated abrasive, a flapwheel is made of multiple overlapping small pieces or 'flaps', bonded to a central hub.

== Advantages ==
The advantages of a flapwheel over a traditional disk are twofold:

- The separate flaps each attack the workpiece surface at a slightly different angle, and this varies slightly with tool angle. This avoids the common problem with flat sheets, where they produce repeated identical scratches.
- Abrasive wear is distributed more evenly across the flaps, and through the length of each flap. Flaps wear from their outer ends and the sheet carrier cuts back as the abrasive coating is worn away. The wheel remains useful even as the flaps erode. Compared to flat sheets, that are discarded after only a small area of the abrasive is truly worn-out, this is a much more efficient use of the abrasive material.

== Development ==
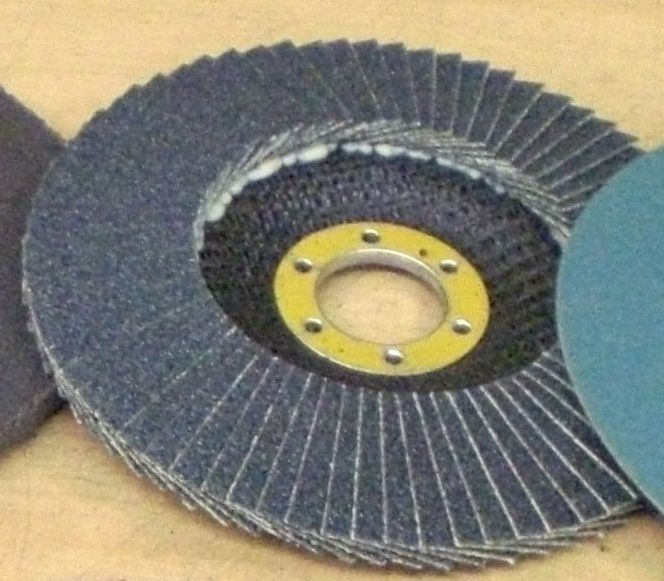
Flap disk for angle grinder use

They appeared in the 1950s and their use was encouraged by developments in gas turbines. These demanded an increased production of fine investment castings that required careful polishing. In particular, the high centrifugal stresses these experienced in service required a finishing technique that did not give rise to oriented scratches that could act as stress risers.

The first flapwheels were made from cut sheets of abrasive, stacked into a multi-layered flat disk. These gained the advantage of long life from their materials, but their geometry was still flat and so they tended to produce surface flats if not carefully handled.

Early flapwheels were large diameter and intended for use on fixed buffing machines. They were used for deburring and polishing of castings, often instead of wire wheels. These cut faster, with less burnishing and surface contamination from the bristles.

Portable flapwheels were made by bonding radial flaps of abrasive into a hub fitted with a spindle shank. These were intended for use with electric drills and were limited to a maximum speed of around 1,000 rpm.

With developments in abrasive coating, the sheet material could withstand greater forces and speeds. This allowed the production of flapwheels for use with high speed angle grinders. (Note: Angle grinders typically run at speeds around 10,000 rpm.) These disks were different in format: flatter, like the original rigid angle grinder disks, and with the flaps arranged in a densely overlapped layout rather than radial. The extra lifetime this gave to the disk allowed their use for stock removal and metal shaping, not just finishing and polishing.

The flexibility of a flapwheel is an advantage for smoothing curved work and avoids the production of facets, as was a problem for rigid disks. This was taken further advantage of with the development of foam-bonded flapwheels. These use fewer flaps, spaced apart by a flexible foam spacer. This makes them even more flexible, thus more suited for producing a smooth finish to curved surfaces.
