= Sander =

Power tool

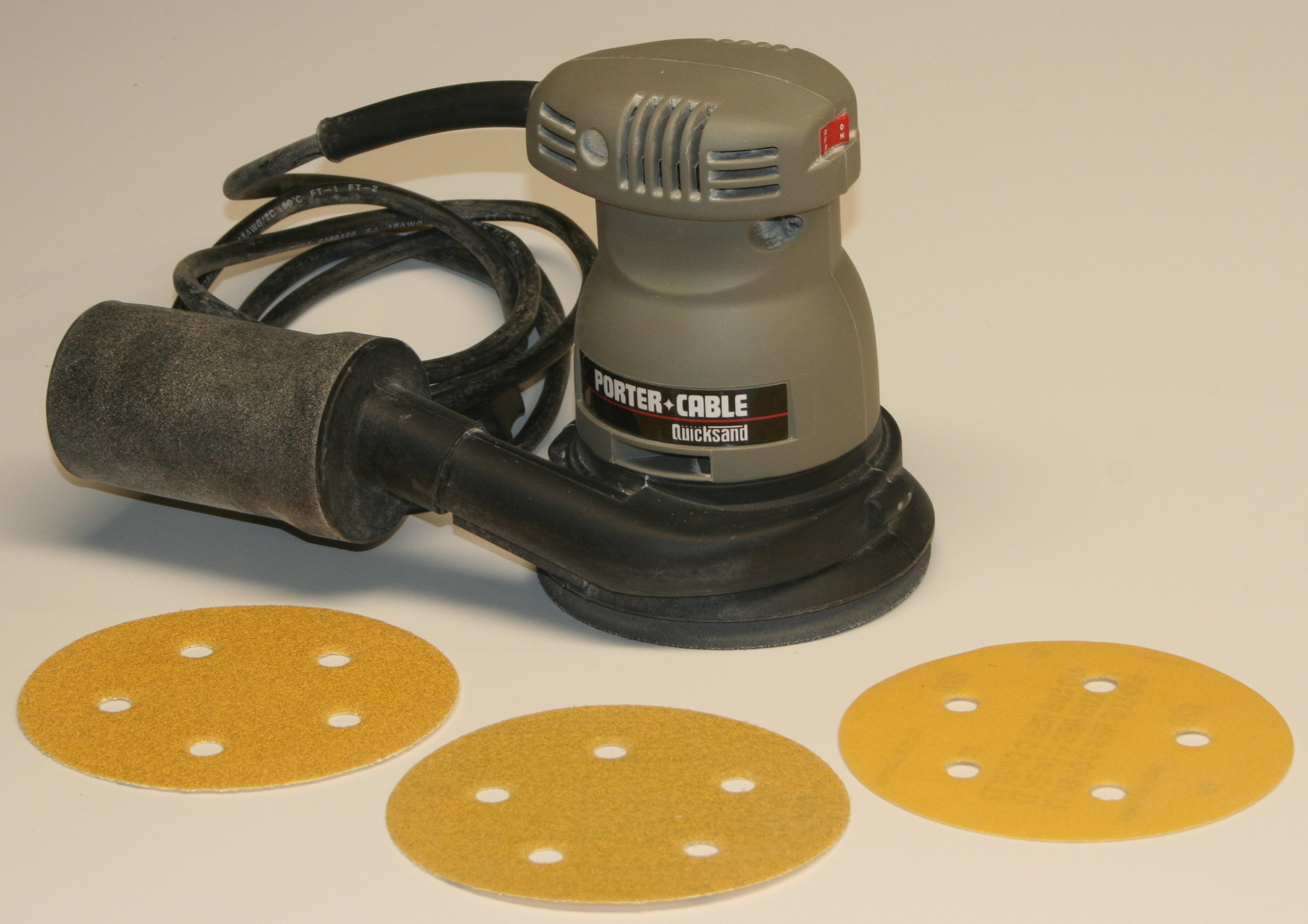
A random orbit sander, with disks of various grit sizes

A sander is a power tool used to smooth surfaces by abrasion with sandpaper. Sanders have a means to attach the sandpaper and a mechanism to move it rapidly contained within a housing with means to handhold it or fix it to a workbench. Woodworking sanders are usually powered electrically, and those used in auto-body repair work are usually powered by compressed air. There are many different types of sanders for different purposes. Multipurpose power tools and electric drills may have sander attachments.

== Types ==
Types of power sanders include:

- Belt sander (hand-held or stationary)
- Detail sander: A hand-held sander that uses a small vibrating head with a triangular piece of sandpaper attached. Used for sanding corners and very tight spaces. Also known as "mouse" or "corner" sanders.
- Disc sander: A disc sander is most commonly implemented as a stationary machine that consists of a replaceable circular shaped sandpaper attached to a wheel turned by an electric motor or compressed air. The usually wooden work piece, (although other materials can be shaped and worked on such as plastics, metals and other soft materials), is sat on a front bench that can be adjusted to various angles. It can be used for rough or fine sanding depending on the sanding grit used.
- Drum sander: A large sander that uses a rotating sanding drum. As with a planer, the operator adjusts feed rollers to feed the wood into the machine. The sander smooths it and sends it out the other side. Good for finishing large surfaces.
- Flap sander or sanding flap wheel: A sanding attachment shaped like a Rolodex and used on a hand-held drill or mounted on a bench grinder for finishing curved surfaces.
- Orbital sander: A hand-held sander that vibrates in small circles, or "orbits." The sanding disk spinning while moving simultaneously in small ellipses causes the orbital action that it is known for. Mostly used for fine sanding or where little material needs to be removed.
- Oscillating spindle sander: A sander mounted on a spindle that both rotates and oscillates in and out or up and down along the axis of the spindle. Good for sanding curves and contours that would be difficult with hand or orbital sanding.
- Profile sander: An industrial machine consisting of a powered transport with a series of workstations for performing shaping, sanding, or other finish operations on one or more edges of components in cabinetry, furniture, shelving, and other products. These machines create and finish decorative edges in an automated process using rotating 'shaping heads', 'sanding wheels', 'foil applicators' and other specialized equipment.
- Random orbital sander: (also known as a palm sander) a hand-held power tool which sands in a random-orbit action of constant irregular overlapping circles.
- Straight-line sander: A sander that vibrates in a straight line, instead of in circles. Good for places where hand sanding is tedious or "blocking" is required. Most are air-powered, a few electric. The first pneumatic straight line sander was patented by Otto Hendrickson in 1969.
- Stroke sander: A large production sander that uses a hand-operated platen on a standard sanding belt to apply pressure. For large surfaces such as tabletops, doors, and cabinets.
- Tabletop drum sander: A bench-top sander that uses a rotating drum. Much like a jointer, the operator adjusts the height of the grit, by changing the grit of sandpaper, to adjust the depth of cut. Wood is hand fed against the drum to achieve a flat, smooth surface. Can be used for surface sanding, edge sanding, stripping paint, cabinet doors, etc.
- Wide-belt sander: A large sander similar in concept to a planer, but much larger. Uses a large sanding belt head instead of a planer's shaping head, and requires air from a separate source to tension the belt. For rough sanding large surfaces or finishing. Used mainly for manufacturing furniture and cabinets.

== Gallery ==
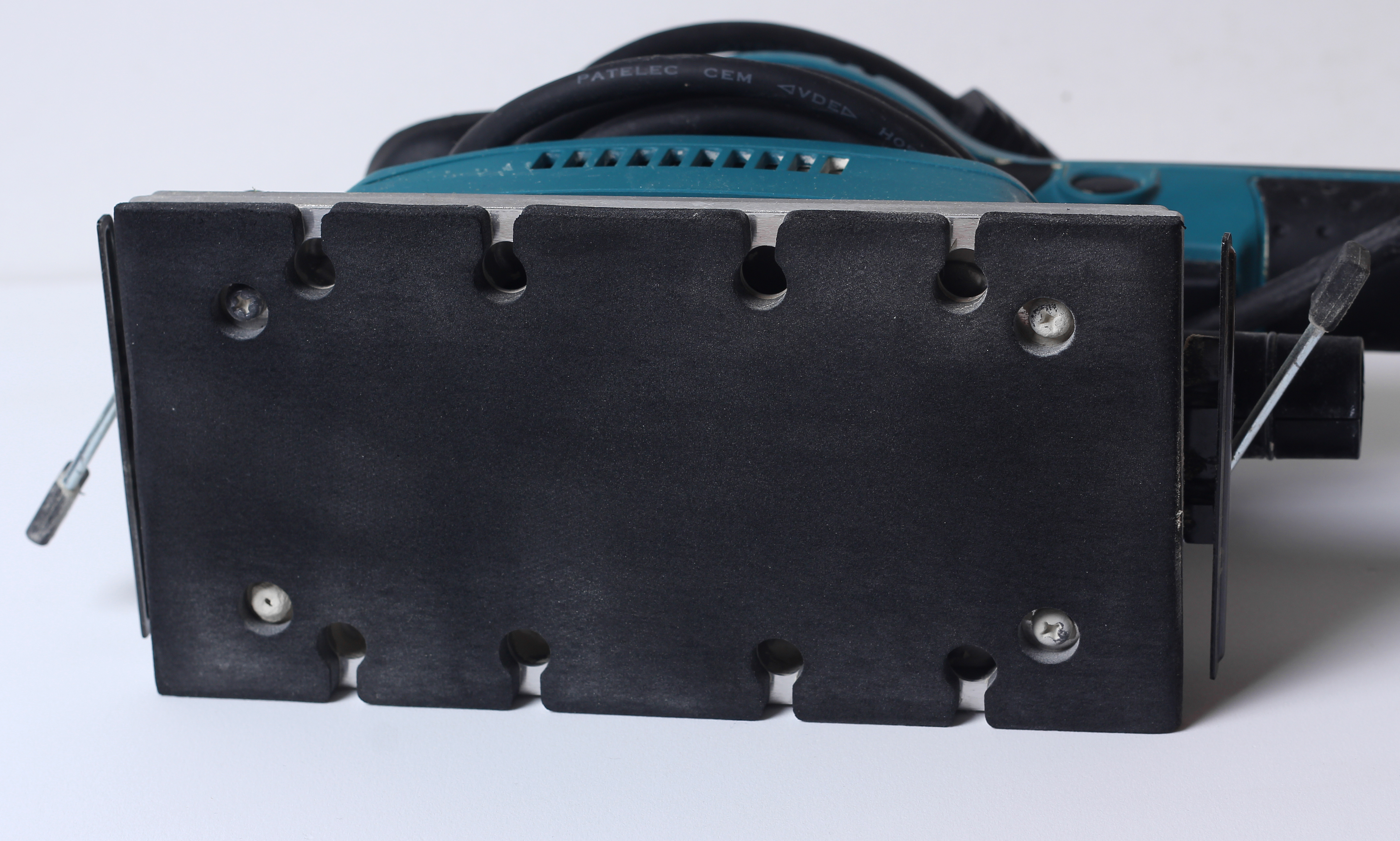
Orbital sander, grinder sole

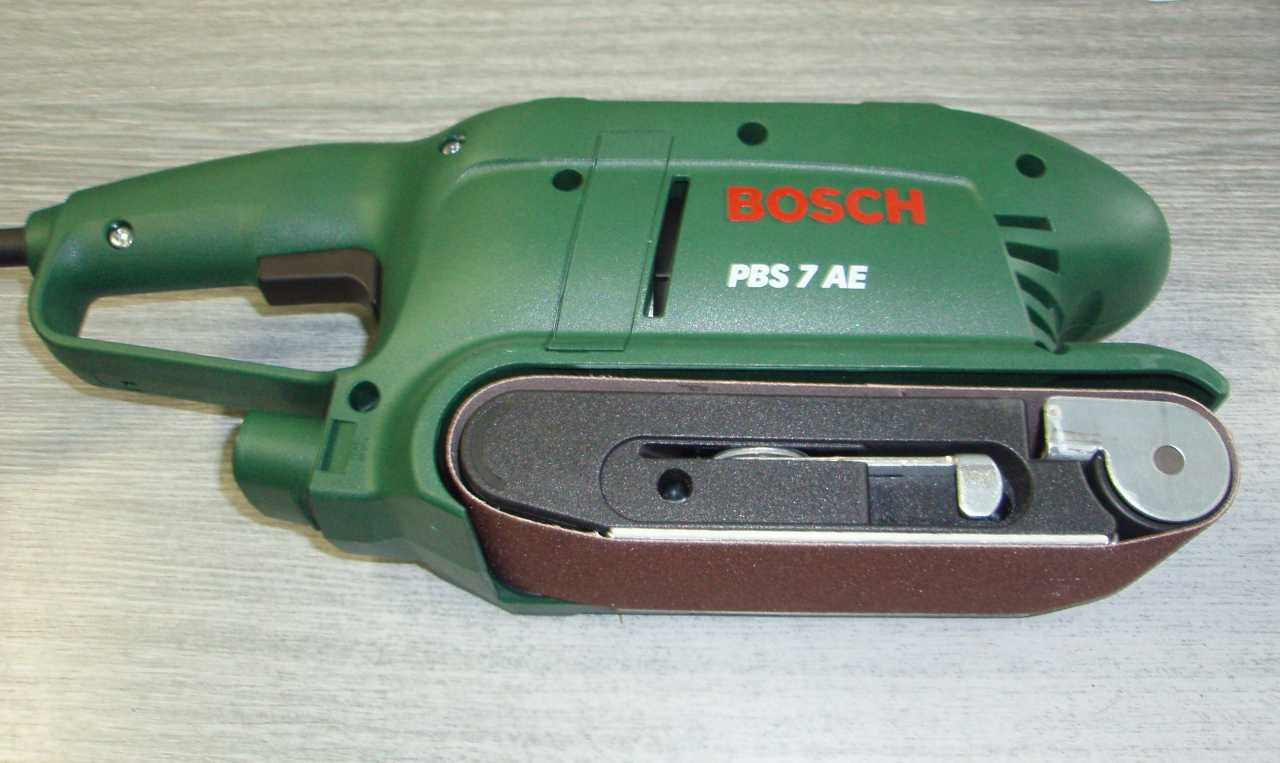
Belt sander, grinder sole

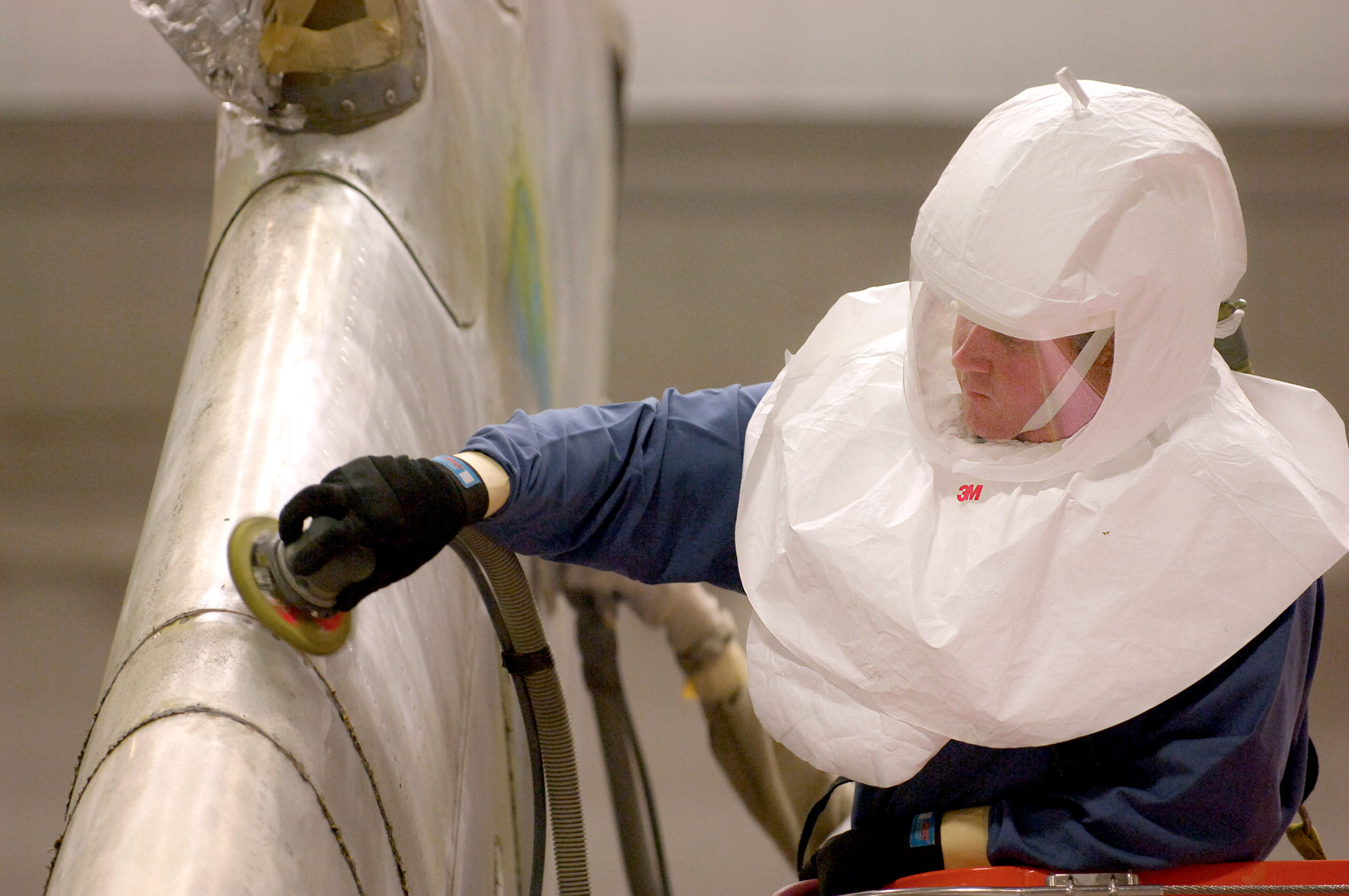
Scuff sanding a KC-10 aircraft, before painting

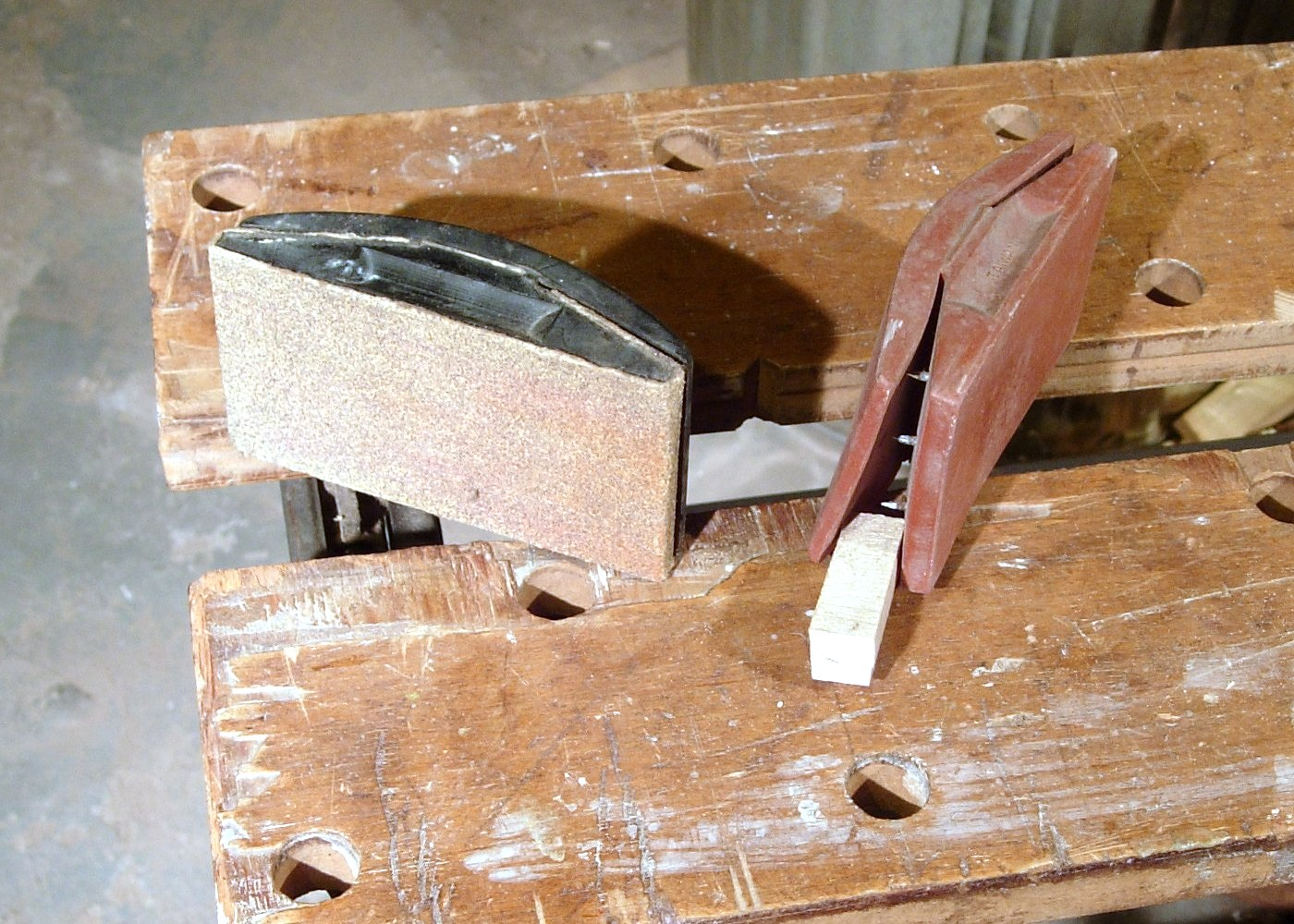
Sanding blocks

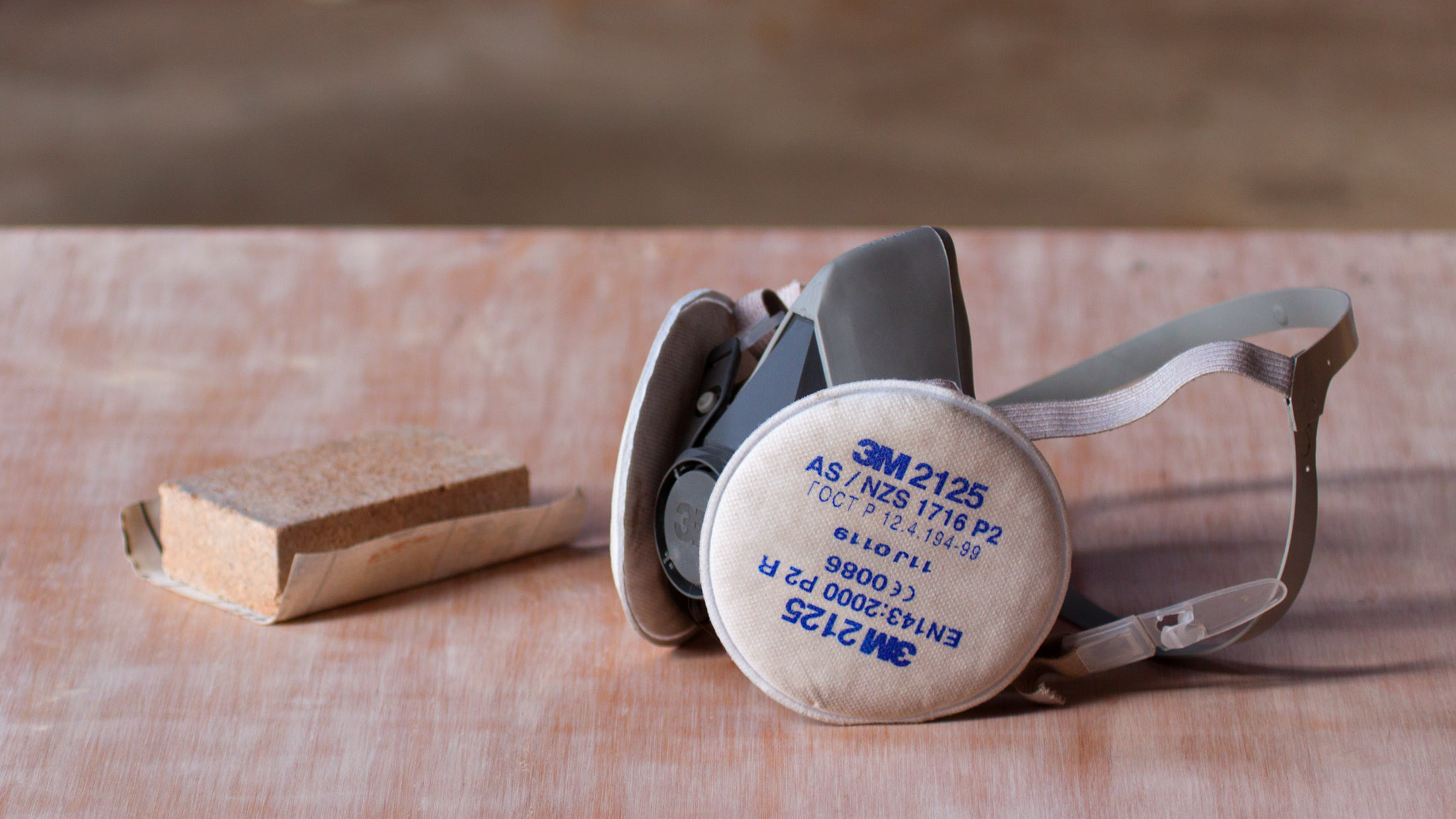

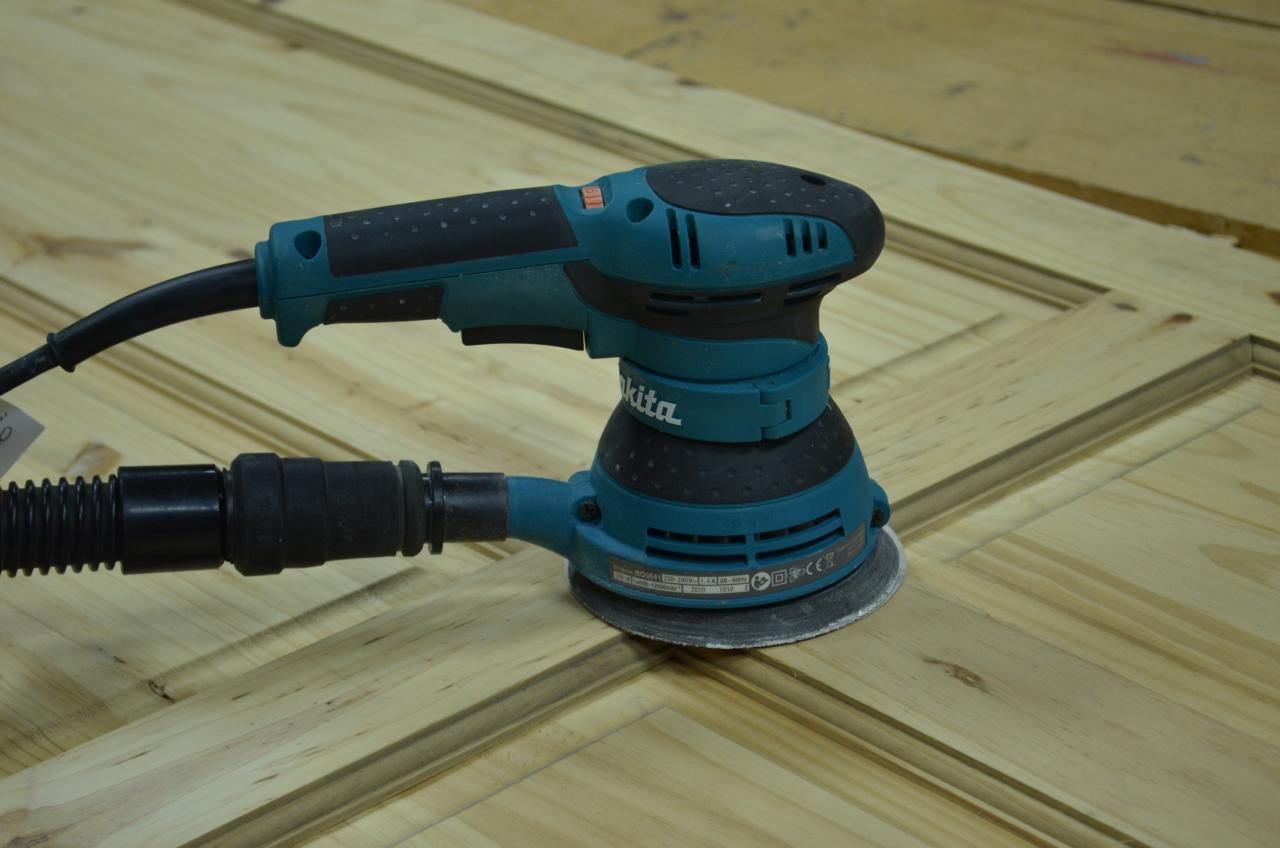
Random Orbit Sander

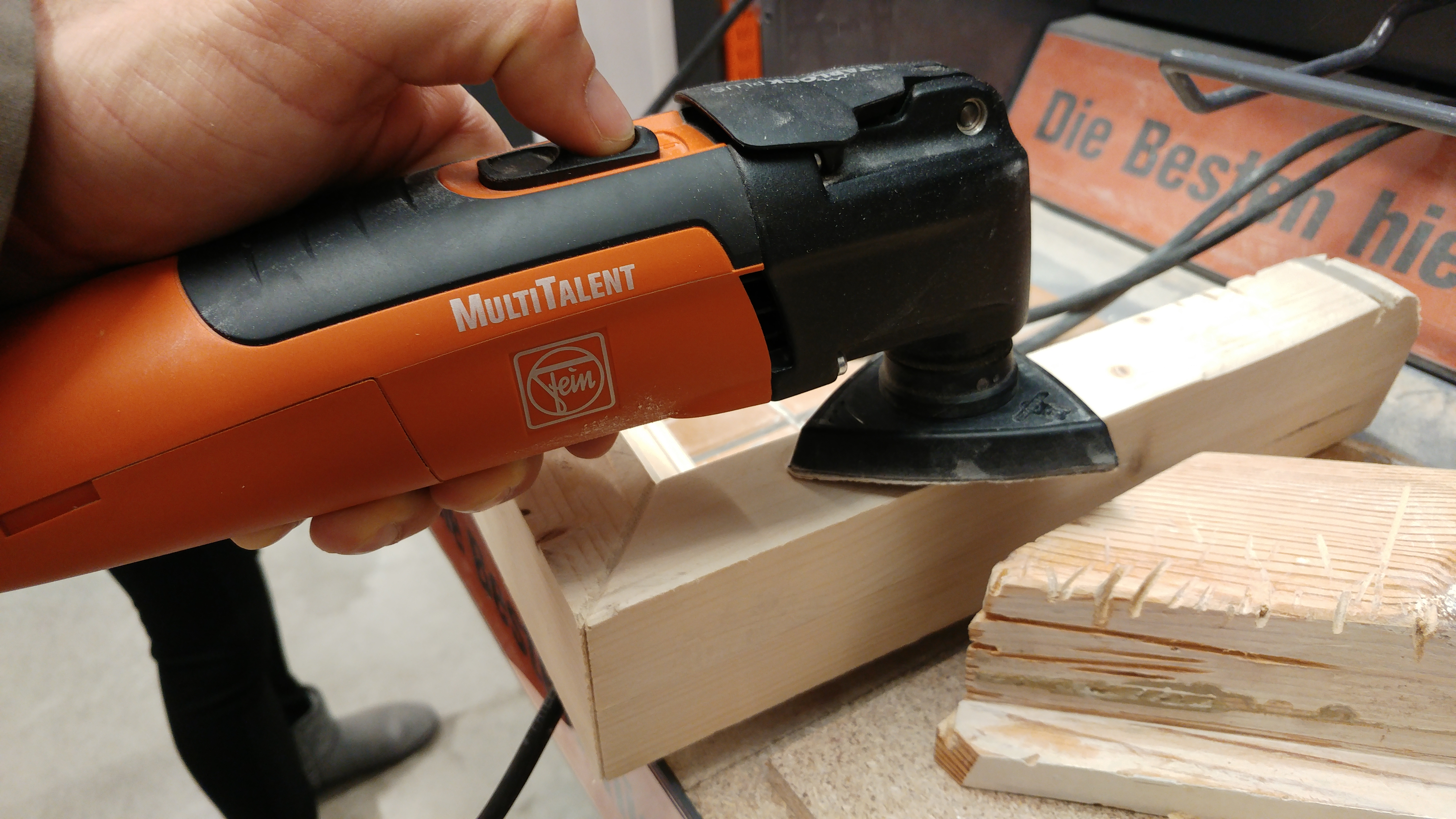

== See also ==
- Flapwheel
