= Oregon Tool =

American saw chain manufacturing company

Oregon Tool, Inc.
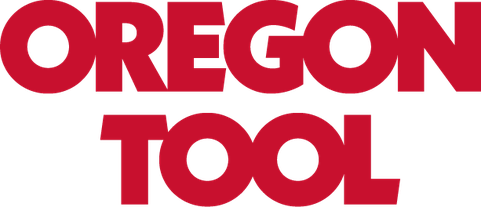
- Company type: Private
- Founded: 1947 in Portland, Oregon
- Headquarters: Portland, Oregon, U.S.
- Key people: Terry Hames (CEO); Joseph Buford Cox (founder)
- Products: Forestry, agriculture, and construction products
- Owner: Platinum Equity
- Website: www.oregontool.com

Oregon Tool, Inc. is an American company that manufactures saw chain and other equipment for the forestry, agriculture, and construction industries. Based in Portland, Oregon, Oregon Tool globally manufactures their products in ten different plants across five countries. Oregon Tool produces and markets saw chain, chain saw bars and sprockets, battery operated lawn and garden equipment, lawn mower blades, string trimmer line, concrete cutting saws and chain, and agricultural cutting equipment for OEMs, dealers, and end-user markets. Oregon Tool employs approximately 3,300 people across the world in 17 global locations.

== History ==
Joseph Buford Cox founded the Oregon Saw Chain Company in 1947. An avid inventor, Cox designed the modern saw chain after witnessing a timber beetle larvae chewing through some timber in a Pacific Northwest forest. The saw chain he ultimately created serves as the foundation for the modern chipper chain design, and influenced other forms of modern saw chain design. Known as Biomimetics, Cox solved a complex problem by taking inspiration from nature. After experimenting with casting techniques, Cox later founded Precision Castparts Corp.

In 1953, John D. Gray acquired the company and changed the name to Omark Industries. In the 1980s, Omark began researching and adopting just-in-time manufacturing processes. By visiting factories in Japan, Omark studied examples of lean manufacturing. The concepts kept the saw chain products viable in the export market during a period with a strong dollar. In 1985, Omark Industries was purchased by Blount Industries, Inc. and its founder, Winton M. Blount.

In 1993, Blount Industries, Inc. was renamed Blount International, Inc., and shifted its focus from construction to manufacturing. In 1997, Blount purchased Frederick Manufacturing Corp. of Kansas City, Missouri and added lawnmower blades and garden products to its portfolio. In 1999, Blount was acquired by Lehman Brothers Merchant Banking. In 2002, Blount's corporate headquarters moved from Montgomery, Alabama, to Portland, Oregon. In 2004, it changed its NYSE symbol to BLT, which remained the company's ticker symbol until 2015.

On December 10, 2015, Blount announced that it would be taken private by American Securities and P2 Capital Partners in an all-cash transaction valued at approximately $855 million, or $10 a share in cash.

On June 3, 2020, Paul Tonnesen was appointed chief executive officer.

On May 10, 2021, Blount Inc. unveiled a new corporate name that positions it for growth while honoring its heritage: Oregon Tool. The shift from Blount, Inc. to Oregon Tool became effective June 2, 2021.

On June 2, 2021, Blount Inc officially became Oregon Tool, Inc.

On July 14, 2021, American Securities and P2 Capital Partners announced the signing of a definitive agreement under which Platinum Equity will acquire Oregon Tool.

On October 18, 2021, Platinum Equity announced that the acquisition of Oregon Tool had been completed.

== Products and brands ==
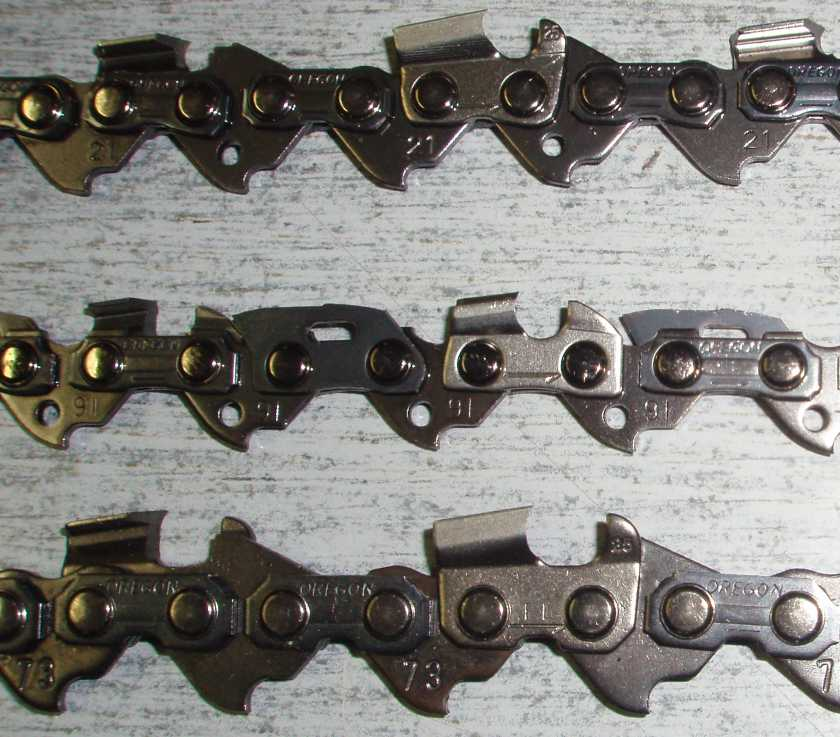
Oregon saw chains

The company manufactures a variety of products for the chainsaw, agriculture, forestry, and construction industries. Oregon Tool manufactures, markets, and distributes products primarily under two hero brands: Oregon and Woods Equipment. Further brands under Oregon Tool include Carlton, Kox, Speeco, Merit, and Pentruder.

In November 2022, Epiroc acquired Wain-Roy from Oregon Tool.

== Oregon products ==
Oregon Tool is the largest manufacturer of saw chain in the world, with the Oregon brand holding the title of #1 saw chain in the world. Saw chain sold under the Oregon brand is sold to OEMs, dealers, and direct-to-consumer. Other products sold under the Oregon brand include: chain saw bar, sprocket, lawn mower blades, and string trimmer string. In addition, the Oregon brand sells several battery-powered and corded electric lawn and garden tools aimed at DIY consumers. These products include lawn mowers, chainsaws, string trimmers, and leaf blowers.

== Woods equipment ==
Woods is the inventor of the first tractor-mounted rotary cutter. Over the years, innovations and upgrades in the design evolved and led to the creation of The Batwing. The Batwing name is derived from the folding motion of the cutting decks as they are brought into their transportation position. This design allows for a wide cutting path while also allowing for easy transportation.

== ICS ==
ICS is a pioneering force in the concrete-cutting industry. As most concrete cutters are of the circular style, ICS develops, markets, and distributes an abrasive style concrete cutting system. This allows users to cut irregular shapes, conduct plunge cuts, and attempt other forms of cutting that are not physically possible with circular cutters. In addition, the abrasive cutting system is safer and has been proven to reduce kickback over circular style cutters.

ICS was rebranded Oregon in October 2022.

It was rebranded back to ICS in late 2023.

== See also ==
- List of companies based in Oregon
