= Coalclaims =

UK compensation scheme

Coalclaims or Coal Health Claims is the collective name for two compensation schemes run by the UK Government. Responsibility for the claims lies with the Department of Energy and Climate Change which split off from the Department for Business, Enterprise and Regulatory Reform (BERR) in October 2008. BERR itself was a rename of the Department of Trade and Industry (DTI).

These schemes exist to compensate UK coal miners and their families in relation to respiratory disease and Vibration white finger (VWF).These are the biggest personal injury schemes in British legal history and possibly the world.

== Coal Health Claims ==
Miners who worked at british coal also known as the National Coal Board can use the help for miners scheme and claim for industrial compensation using the Industrial disease benefit scheme.

== Controversy ==
As of November 2008, two solicitors who won personal injury claims for thousands of miners have appeared before a tribunal accused of taking cuts from compensation pay-outs. Jim Beresford, 58, and Douglas Smith, 51, from Beresfords Solicitors in Doncaster, denied 11 allegations of misconduct at the hearing in London. Jim Beresford was notably the highest paid solicitor in the UK for the year of 2006 as a consequence of Coalclaims work.
