= Chainsaw carving =

Form of art

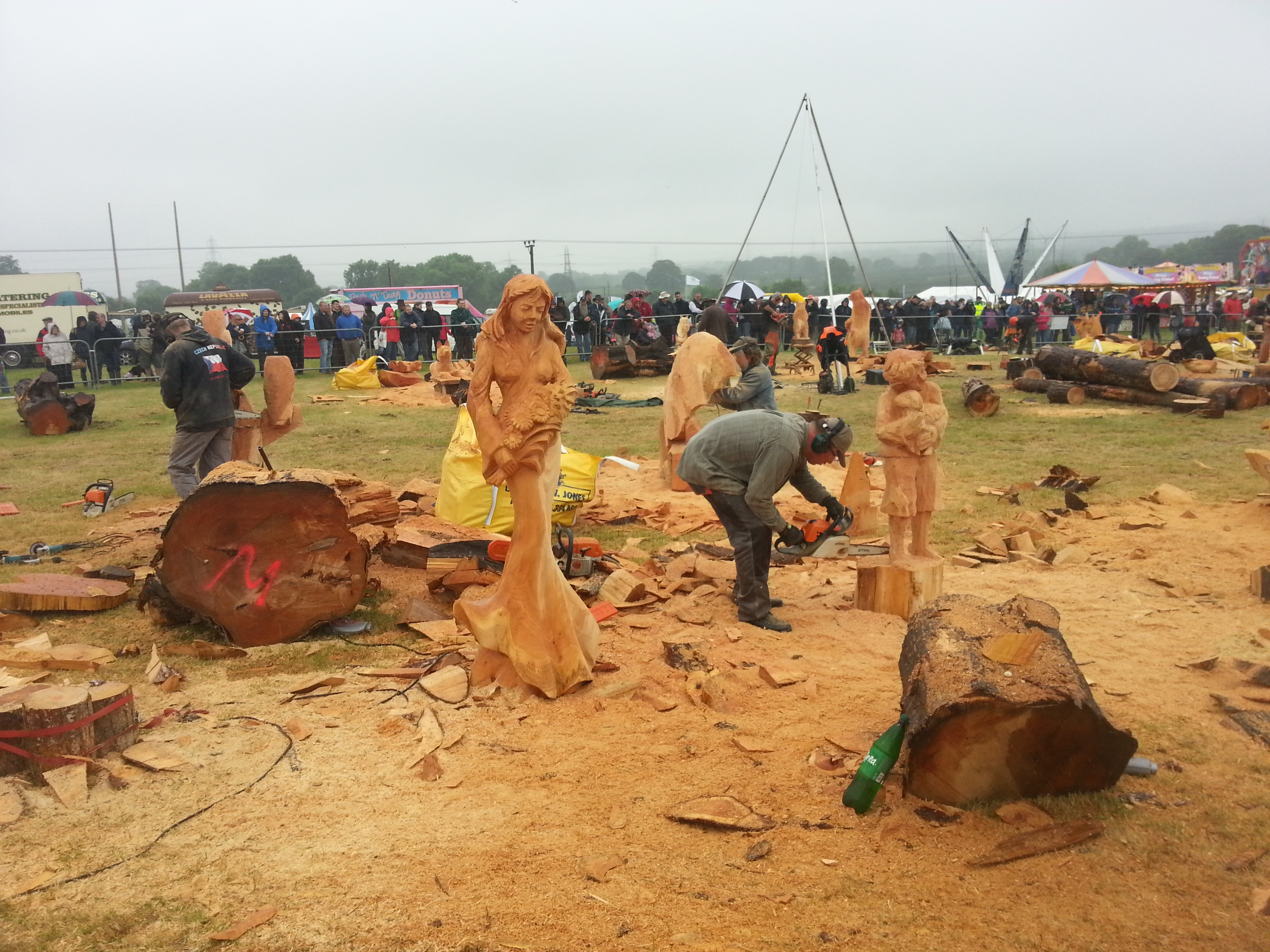
Wood carving with a chainsaw

The art of chainsaw carving is a fast-growing form of art that combines the modern technology of the chainsaw with the ancient art of woodcarving.

== The beginning of the art form ==
The oldest chainsaw artist records go back to the 1950s, which include artists Ray Murphy and Ken Kaiser. In 1952 Ray Murphy used his father's chainsaw to carve his name into a piece of wood. In 1961 Ken Kaiser created 50 carvings for the Trees of Mystery.

Many new artists began to experiment with chainsaw carving, including Brenda Hubbard, Judy McVay, Don Colp, Cherie Currie (former Runaways lead singer), Susan Miller, Mike McVay, and Lois Hollingsworth. At this time chainsaw carvers started loading up their carvings in the back of their trucks, functioning as traveling galleries.

In the 1980s, the art form really began to grow with Art Moe getting much exposure for the craft at the Lumberjack World Championships held in Hayward, Wisconsin. This event was broadcast nationally. The addition of carving contests from the west coast to the east coast brought carvers together to test their skills and learn from each other. The first Chainsaw Carving World Championships was held in 1987 and won by then 24-year-old Barre Pinske. The 1980s also saw the development of the Cascade Chainsaw Sculptors Guild and their newsletter, The Cutting Edge, mailed out to many members throughout the Pacific Northwest and the rest of the United States. The 80's also brought the first book on chainsaw carving, Fun and Profitable Chainsaw Carving by William Westenhaver and Ron Hovde, published in 1982. Other books soon followed, including a book by Hal MacIntosh published in 1988 titled Chainsaw Art and in 2001 Chainsaw Carving: The Art and Craft. He published material on chainsaw carving that predated the popularity of the Internet.

The first booking agency dedicated to promoting and preserving the integrity of performance chainsaw art was founded by Brian Ruth in 1992. It was appropriately named Masters of the Chainsaw. The company has represented some of the most respected artists in the U.S., SAWDUST such as Brian Ruth, Ben Risney, Josh Landry, Mark Tyoe and Marty Long, as well as select artists from other countries. In 2007, Masters of the Chainsaw, under the direction of Jen Ruth, created the first international group of female sculptors under the name Chainsaw Chix. Featured in this all-female team are greats like Stephanie Huber, Angela Polglaze, Lisa Foster, Alicia Charlton, Uschi Elias, and Sara Winter.

Brian Ruth introduced the art as a performance art to Japan in 1995. Since then, he has established a division of Masters of the Chainsaw and a chainsaw carving school in Tōei, Japan.

Although the general impression of the public is that it is largely performance art (because of the noise, sawdust, and very fast carving results), there are a few chainsaw carvers now producing stunning works of art. These works can be produced in a fraction of the time that would normally be expected if only conventional tools such as mallet and gouges were used. Although many carvers continue to use other tools alongside the chainsaw, the chainsaw remains the primary tool.

== The Carver Kings ==
With the growth of the Internet, chainsaw carving has become a worldwide phenomenon, with chainsaw carvers active around the world. In Canada, Paul and Jacob of the Carver Kings gained attention through HGTV's Carver Kings and OLN's Saw Dogs, as well as for creating large-scale, semi-abstract centerpieces that have made it to many major states.

== Today ==
In the United Kingdom, the English Open Chainsaw Competition draws thousands of visitors annually. In 1989 Duncan Kitson was the first British carver, with notable success, to represent Wales and The UK in international competition. His work is recognized for its individual, engineered and tactile qualities. English chainsaw artist Matthew Crabb has carved the largest wooden statue of the Virgin Mary in the world, at 9 meters high, in Schochwitz, Germany. Welsh veteran, Harry Thomas of Thomas Carving is highly respected in the industry and specialises in bears, along with his son Danny Thomas. Harry has appeared on ITV's Daybreak, where he carved Queen Elizabeth II's head, in celebration of her Diamond Jubilee.

In Canada, many wooden statues produced by the chainsaw artist Pete Ryan decorate the small town of Hope, British Columbia. Glenn Greensides, another Canadian artist, branched out into Japan in 1995 and visited Japan each year for 12 consecutive years to create one 5-meter-tall (16 ft) sculpture from an exported British Columbia log depicting the upcoming year's Japanese zodiac symbol.

In Japan, the Toei Chainsaw Art Club established the World Chainsaw Art Competition, which was the first chainsaw carving competition in the country. The 2011 World Chainsaw Art Competition at the Toei Dome was to be dedicated to raising money for disaster relief due to the Fukushima Daiichi nuclear disaster that has affected the country.

1999 marked the first year of the Ridgway Chainsaw Carving Rendezvous. Every February hundreds of carvers go to a small town in the mountains of Pennsylvania for this event. The Chainsaw Carver Rendezvous is the biggest gathering of chainsaw carvers in the world and takes over the small town of Ridgway, Pennsylvania.

In 2010 American sculptor Bob King was awarded a "Star/Sprocket" on the Carvers Walk of Fame in Mulda, Germany, the location of the World Cup competition. This award confirms Bob has won more carving competitions than any other carver in the world to date.

In 2013, American chainsaw carver, Josh Landry, was awarded first place at the "Rally in the Valley" chainsaw carving competition. In previous years, Josh Landry was the youngest chainsaw carver participating in national and international chainsaw carving competitions.

As the art has evolved, special chainsaw blades and chains have been developed for carving. In Finland such equipment is affectionally called konepuukko ("mechanical puukko").

The chainsaw "blades" are technically known as "guide bars". For chainsaw carving these bars have very small noses (typically around 25 mm diameter). This enables the artist to create detail in the carving that would be impossible with a standard guide bar. The chains that are used on these guide bars are normally modified by reducing the length of the teeth in order that they are able to cut efficiently at the tip of the bar. The reason for this modification is that all chains manufactured currently (circa 2007) are made to be used on standard guide bars only. These "carving bars" are manufactured by "Cannon", "GB", and by a companies in Japan supplying "Stihl" and others. The other very important advantage with these guide bars is that they do not "kickback" when using the tip. they are therefore very safe to use in comparison with standard guide bars.

In order to reach the high levels of skill required to be a "chainsaw carver", a considerable amount of instruction and practice is required in the safe operation of a chainsaw. This is then followed by plenty of study and practice in carving basic shapes which then ultimately leads on to more ambitious projects. Chainsaw carvers wear protective clothing. A cut from a chainsaw is not just a cut, it actually removes a whole centimeter or more of flesh and bone. A victim can die very quickly from blood loss.

A Cut Above, a Canadian reality competition television series featuring chainsaw carvers, premiered in 2022.

== Chainsaw carvers' guilds ==
Two guilds have formed for chainsaw artists. The Cascade Chainsaw Sculptors Guild (CCSG) is a nonprofit organization that was founded by a group of chainsaw artists in 1986. In 1993, the CCSG started putting out a bimonthly newsletter, "The Cutting Edge". Another nonprofit guild, United Chainsaw Carvers Guild, was established in 2002 and published a quarterly newsletter titled "The Chainsaw Letter", but has since stopped publishing its newsletter. Both guilds claim to promote chainsaw art and the sharing of ideas amongst fellow artisans.

== Images ==
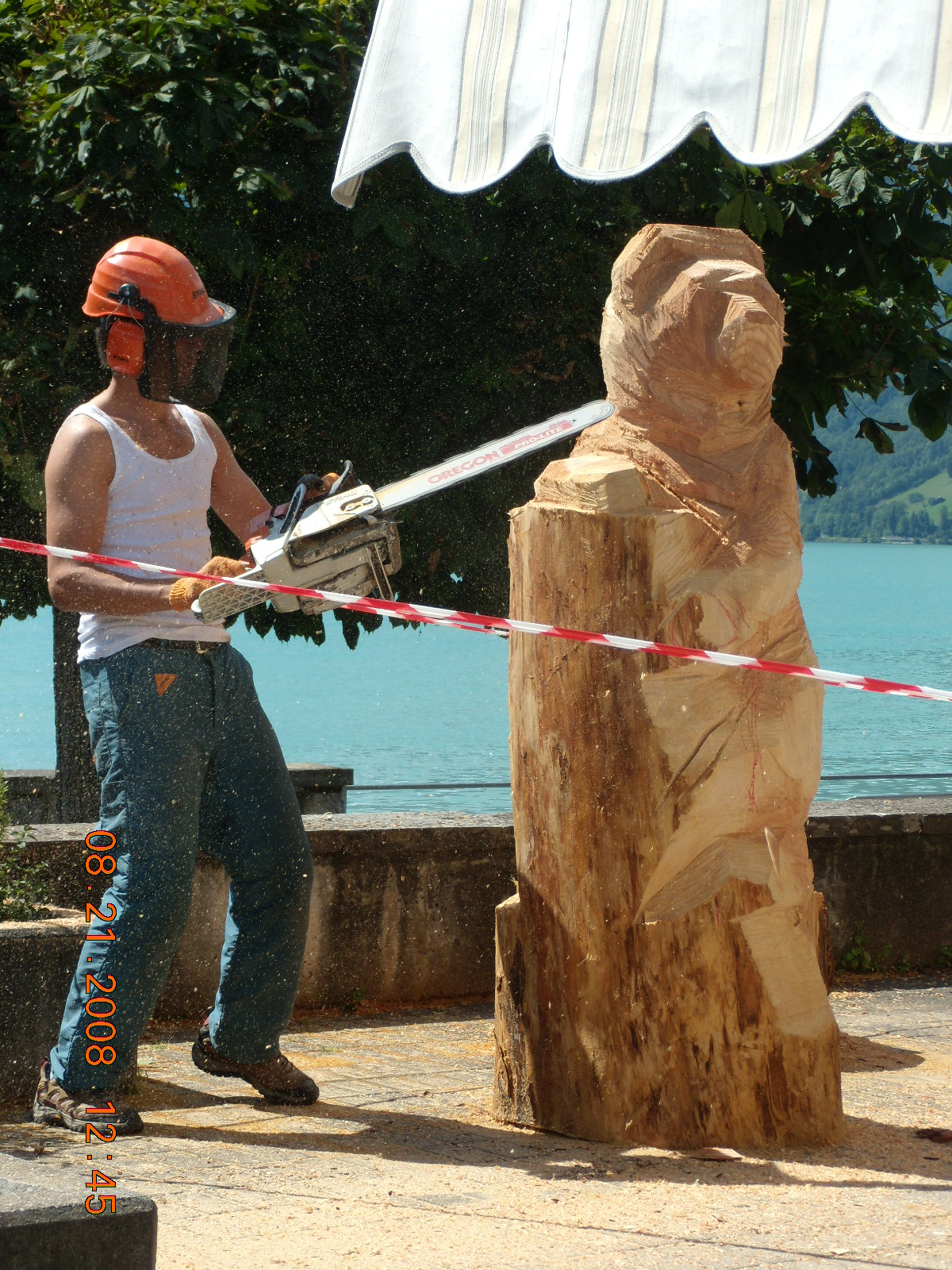
A man carving a Bernese bear with a chainsaw in Brienz, Switzerland

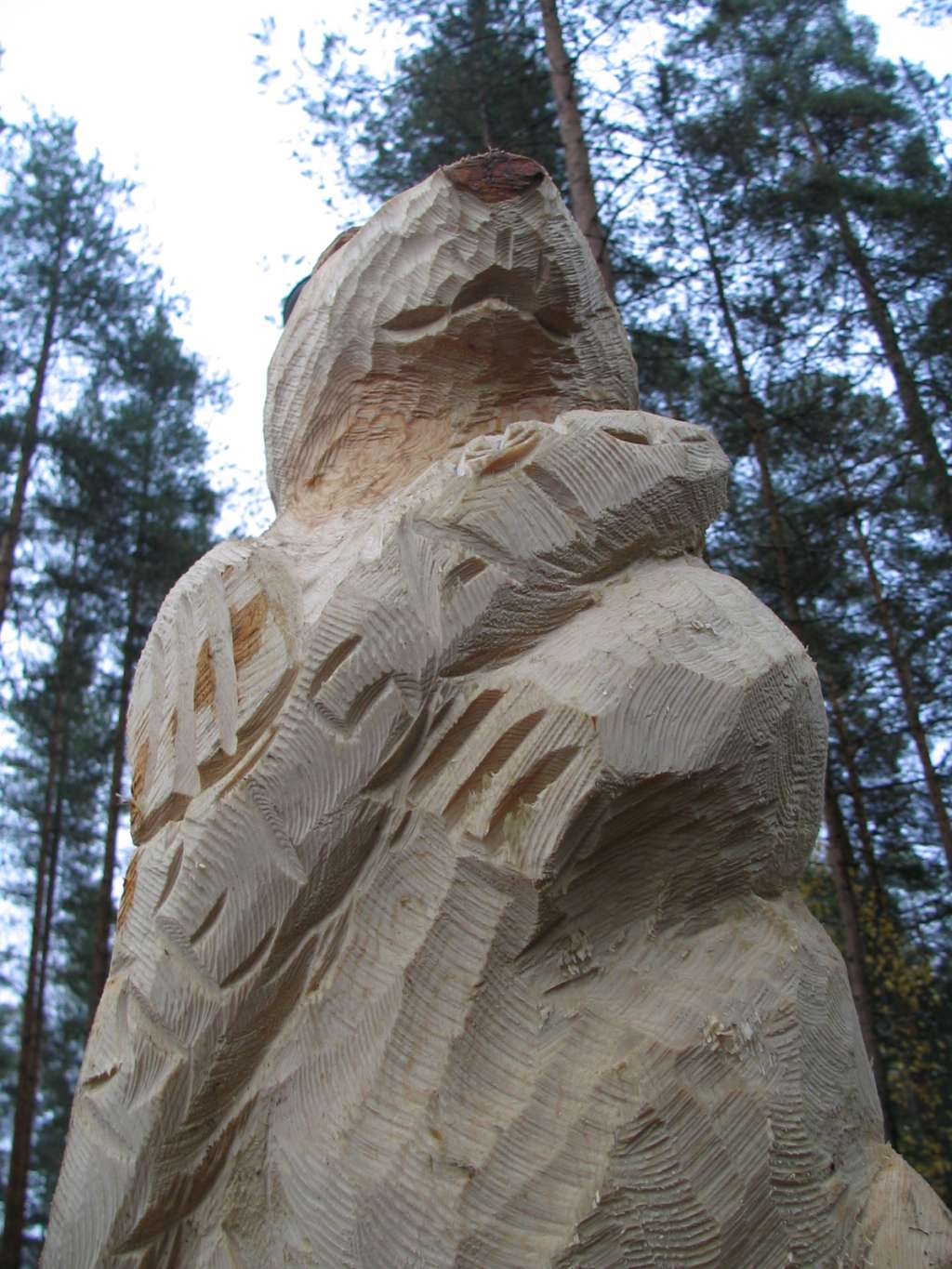
Carving of beaver in Joensuu, Finland

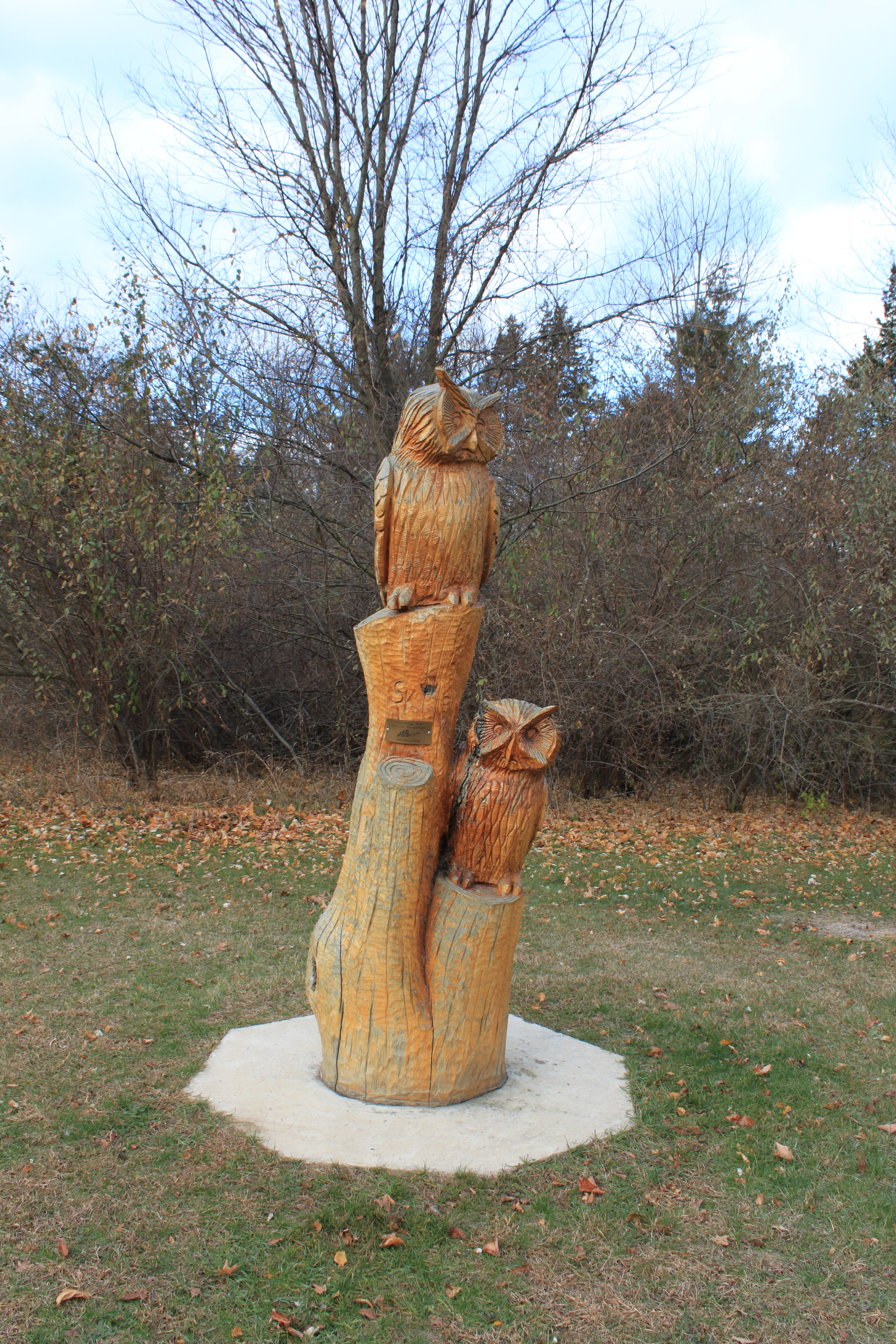
Carving of owls, Brighton Recreation Area, Michigan

World's tallest Virgin Mary carving at Schochwitz, Germany

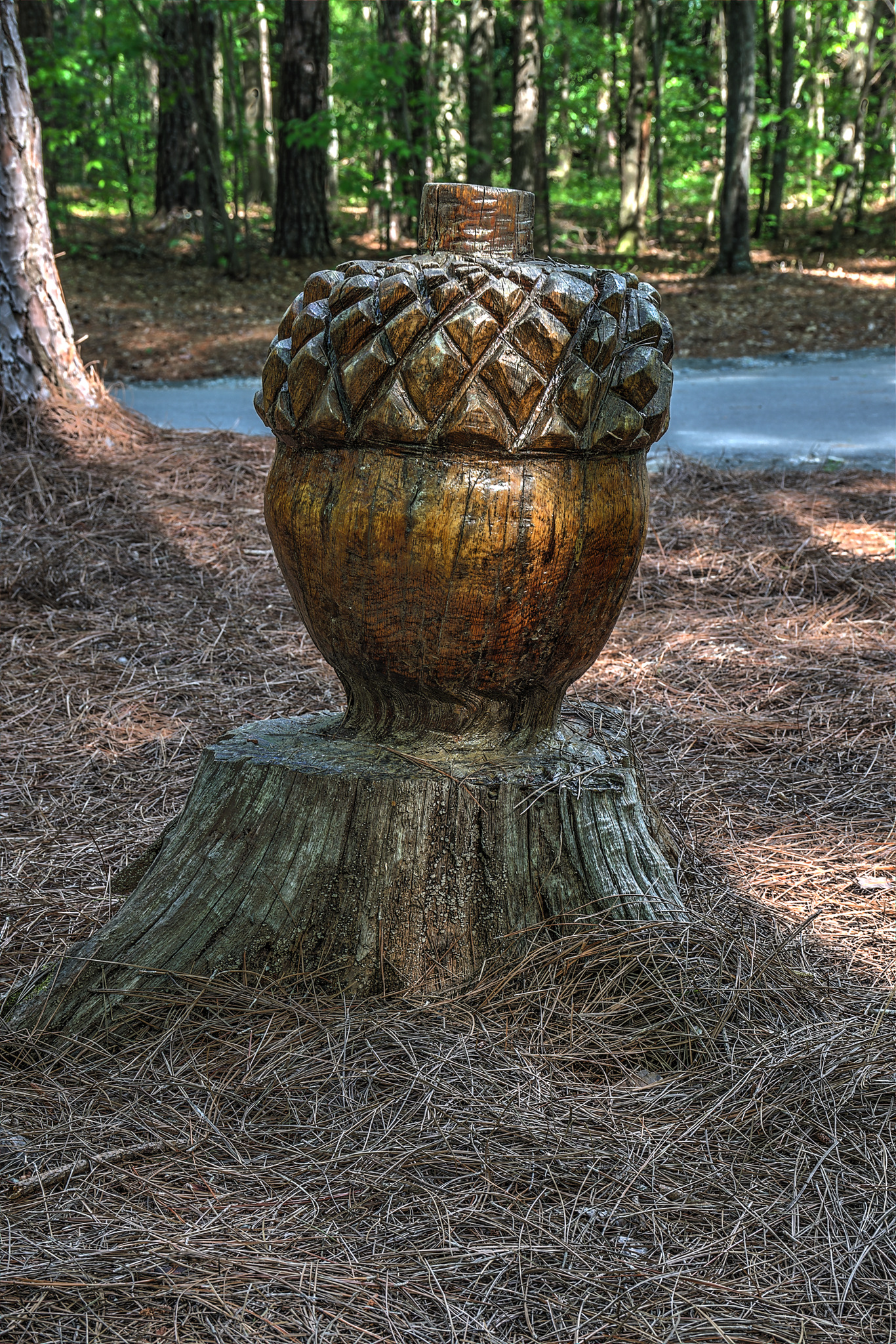
Acorn Carving at Dauset Trails Nature Center

== See also ==
- Ice sculpture
- List of chainsaw carving competitions
