= Joseph Buford Cox =

American inventor

Joseph Buford Cox (1905 – August 10, 2002), was an American inventor and businessman. He invented what is now known as the chipper type chain for chain saws. He based his design on the C-shaped jaws of the larva of the timberman beetle. Cox watched the destructive larvae of the timber beetle (Ergates spiculatus) for many hours. The beetle's cutting action was left and right, side to side, rather than scratching or burrowing straight ahead. Cox adapted this concept to a new chain saw of his own design put into production during the late 1940s.

Joseph and his wife, Alice, founded "The Oregon Saw Chain Co." in 1947. Cox later started a small casting company called OMARK, now known as "Omark Industries". In time, Oregon Saw Chain became a subsidiary of Omark Industries which was in turn acquired in 1985 by Blount, Inc., of Montgomery, Alabama. Blount merged in 1999 with Lehman Brothers Merchant Banking Partners and became known as Blount International, Inc. Today the company is known as Oregon Tool, Inc. Most chainsaws, with the exception of some Stihl saws, use an Oregon chain based on the invention of Joseph Buford Cox.

Joseph Buford Cox only reached the fifth grade in his formal education.

They had no children. Alice Erikson Cox left her fortune to be used by the Willmar Community Area Foundation on behalf of the people of Kandyohi County and Lake Lillian in central Minnesota.
