= Matthew Crabb =

English chainsaw carving artist (born 1983)

Matthew Crabb (born Matthew Stuart Crabb on September 29, 1983) is an English chainsaw carving artist.

== Early life ==
Born in Dorset, he currently lives and works on the edge of Exmoor. Crabb's interest in Art was leading towards a career in Graphic Design, but took a twist whilst he was working in a power tool hire shop. Here he became interested in chainsaws and their potential in sculpting art. Initially Crabb drew his inspiration from his rural backdrop, with many sculptures taking the form of wildlife scenes. Crabb also experimented with contemporary art. Crabb is best known for his record-breaking 9 metre high Virgin Mary, commissioned by Lord James Welsh and Countess Ingrid Zerfowski, as a centrepiece for the "Healing Castle" at Schochwitz in East Germany during 2010/11.

== Style ==
Crabb's carvings are sought after as both interior design pieces and for use in outdoor spaces. Crabb's unique and spectacular carvings are created straight from his imagination, often inspired by the particular properties and characteristics of the wood he is working with and therefore no two pieces are ever the same. Crabb also sculpts in situ, creating art from fallen trees, or tree stumps. His work on the Abbotsbury Sub-tropical Gardens in Dorset produced some beautiful wildlife scenes. Crabb's more recent pieces have taken on mythical/fantasy theme.

== Method ==
Crabb uses various sized chainsaws to sculpt his art, starting with large blades to remove large sections of timber moving down in size until he requires small chainsaws for the precise details.

== Current work ==
For the Sandringham Cup chainsaw carving competition in August 2011, Crabb brought to life Duelling Dinosaurs – Raptor v Brachiasaurus.

In August 2011, Crabb entered the English National Chainsaw carving competition at the Cheshire Game and Country Fair at Tatton Park, against 35 of the world's top chainsaw carvers from Japan, the USA, Australia, Sweden, Germany, Italy, Bulgaria, Russia, Uganda and the UK. He had 3 days to complete a large original sculpture. Although Crabb achieved second place beating the world champion, at the end of competition auction his "Dragon's Mouth Throne" fetched twice that of the carving awarded first place, sparking a debate on BBC Radio 2. This earned Crabb a feature in the October edition of Field and Rural Life Magazine.

Between commissions, Crabb is currently finishing a fantasy dragon's head. Crabb is planning a series of fantasy creatures' heads.

== Appearances ==
Crabb has appeared on ITV's This Morning, creating simple carvings for Irish landscape designer and television personality Diarmuid Gavin.
