= Saw chain =

Key component of a chainsaw

The saw chain, or cutting chain, is a key component of a chainsaw. It consists of steel links held together by rivets, and superficially resembles the bicycle-style roller chain, although it is closer in design to a leaf chain. Its key differences are sharp cutting teeth on the outside of the chain loop, and flat drive links on the inside, to retain the chain on the saw's bar and allow propulsion by the engine or motor.

Saw chains (and chainsaws generally) are used for cutting wood. This may be for harvesting trees for pulp or timber, for tree surgery, or for processing firewood.

Whether for hand-held chainsaws, mechanical timber harvesters or chain mortisers, the saw chain has undergone dramatic development since its invention. Modern chains designed for high power, high-speed sawing applications will vastly outperform older designs, while allowing a far greater degree of safety and reliability in use.

== Principles of saw chain operation ==
Saw chains operate by being propelled around a guide bar, removing material from the kerf by cutting chips from the side and bottom. In order to operate properly, the depth to which each tooth cuts must be limited to avoid it binding in the wood. Scratcher chain, like the teeth on a hand saw, simply uses a multitude of teeth to prevent individual teeth from sinking too far in without undue pressure on the bar. Chipper chain, and all subsequent designs, incorporate a depth gauge (also known as a "raker") on each cutter link to limit depth of cut on each tooth. This has two distinct advantages over scratcher chain – it enables the use of fewer cutters per unit length of chain, which allows for shorter downtime for sharpening, and produces a more "open" chain layout, allowing far better clearance of chips and debris from the kerf. Individual depth gauges on each tooth also enable the use of skip chain. Skip or semi-skip chain has a further reduction in the number of teeth and is used for applications where much debris is produced, such as ripping or cross-cutting very large sections of wood. Skip chain also absorbs less power from the motor per unit length of chain than full-complement chain, allowing the use of a longer bar/chain combination on any given motor.

== Early saw chain designs ==
=== Scratcher teeth ===
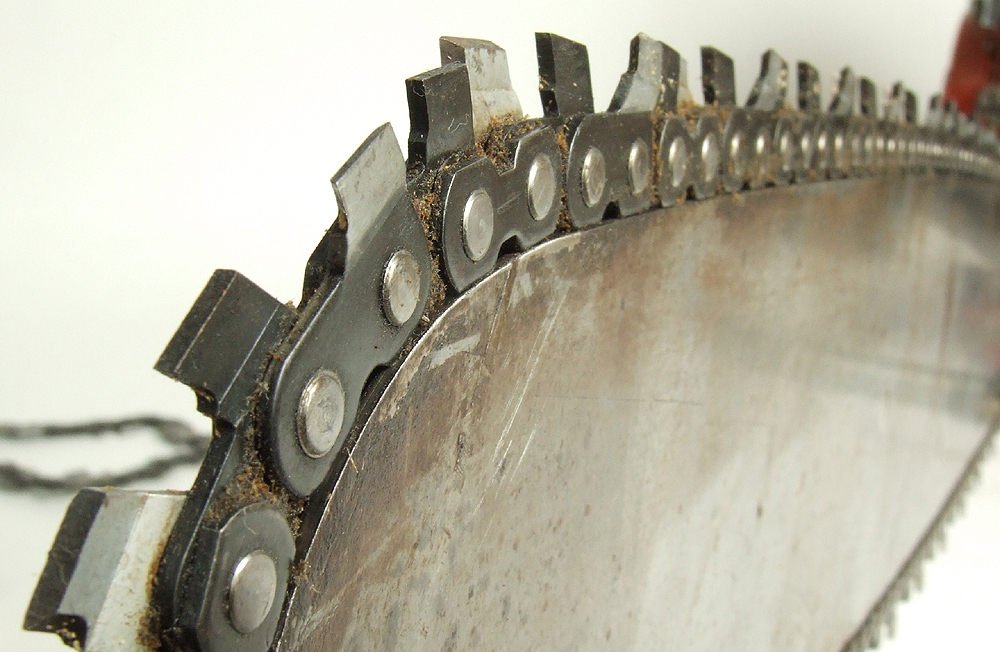
A section of "scratcher" chain on a bar nose, showing the tooth layout.

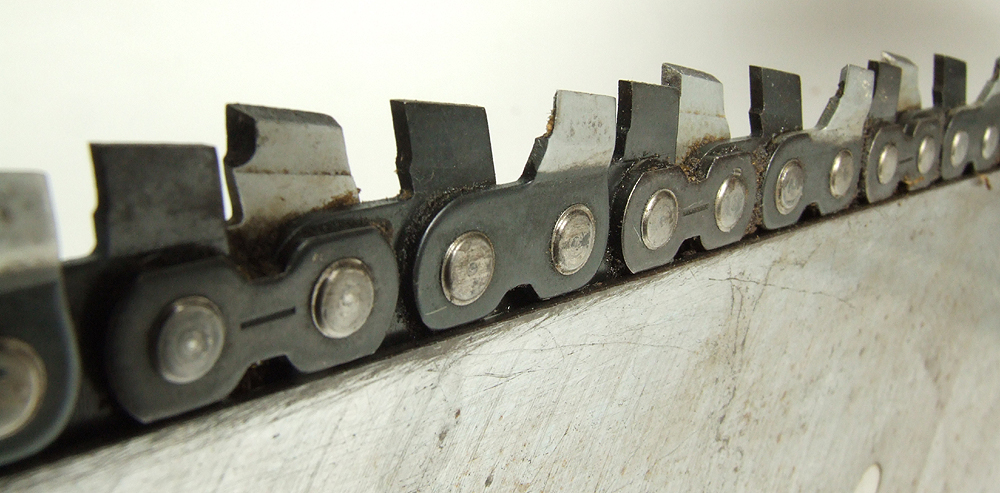
A section of "scratcher" chain showing the large number of teeth compared to modern chain.

Very early chainsaws used tooth configurations very similar to conventional hand saws. These were very simple saw teeth following a wave pattern (left, centre, right, centre) with no depth gauges as such, relying purely on bar pressure to limit the cutting rate. They were inefficient and slow in use, and were soon superseded by chipper chain. They required great skill and a lot of time to sharpen in the field leading to extended downtime between sessions.

=== Chipper teeth ===
Chipper chain invented by Joseph Cox improved dramatically on the performance of scratcher chain. Chipper used a tooth that was curled over the top of the chain, with alternate teeth pointing left and right. Ahead of the tooth was a depth gauge, which allowed for good clearance around the tooth for chip clearing while limiting the depth of cut and preventing grabbing or overloading. Chipper chains are sometimes used for dirty work, since their very large working corner allows the cutter to retain its effective sharpness for a long time in abrasive conditions.

== Modern tooth designs ==
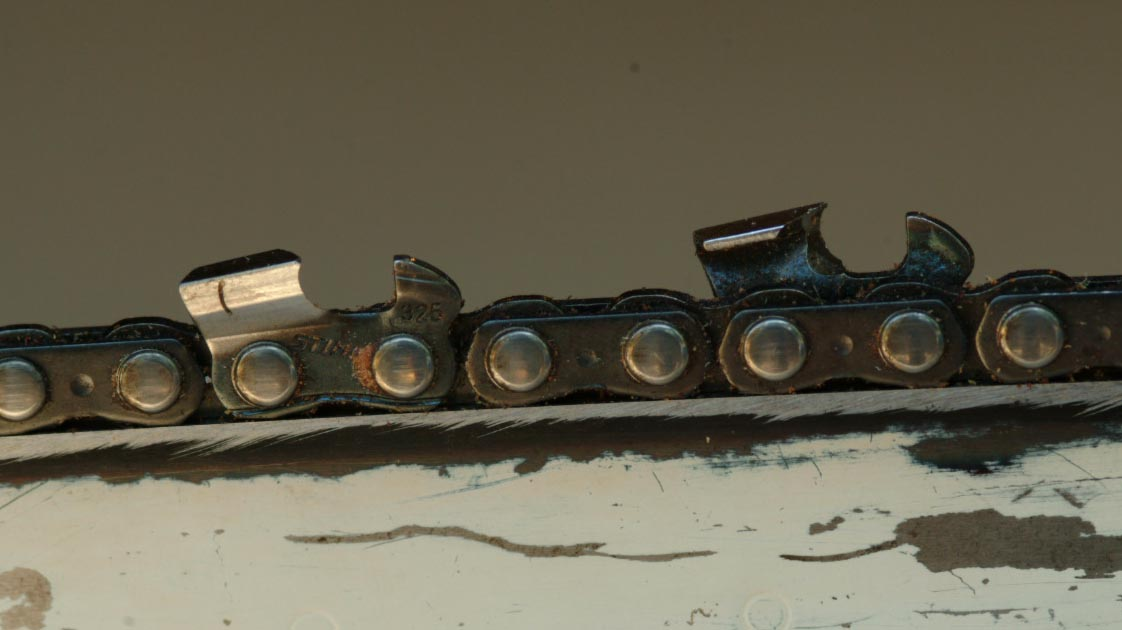
Full-chisel chain

Modern chains for general use in forestry, tree surgery and firewood cutting come in three basic configurations: the full chisel, the semi-chisel, and the chipper chain.

=== Full chisel saw chains ===
The full chisel chain has square-cornered teeth, splitting wood fibers easily in the cut for fast, efficient cutting in clean softwood. Chisel chains have a high kick-back risk due to missing safety chain elements and are more susceptible to damage from dirt. These chains are available for semi-pro (also called pro-sumer) and professional saws.

=== Semi-chisel saw chains ===
The semi-chisel chain has teeth with rounded corners formed by a radius between the top and side plates. While slower than full chisel in softwood, it retains an acceptable cutting sharpness longer, making it the preferred choice for dirtier wood, hard or dry wood, frozen wood or stump work, all of which would rapidly degrade full chisel chain. They are similar to the full chisel design but have a small 45 degree chamfer between the plates rather than a radius. Performance is similar to full chisel. Semi chisel chains have a lower kick-back risk. These chains are available for consumer, semi-pro and professional saws.

=== Low-profile chains ===
Low-profile chains are chains with low teeth and safety elements between teeth. These chains are used on consumer and small professional saws for non-experienced operators. These chains are more insensitive against dirt, but require more frequent sharpening.

=== Chipper chains ===
The chipper chain is similar to the semi-chisel chain. The key differences between are the size of the radius at the working corner. In cross-section a chipper tooth looks like a question mark, having a full radius over the whole cutting portion of the tooth, whereas a semi chisel design is more like a number "7" with the top-right corner slightly rounded.

== Chain arrangements ==
There are also different arrangements of teeth on the chain.

=== Full complement chain ===
Chain has a left cutter, drive link, right cutter, drive link arrangement and is used for most applications.

=== Skip chain ===
Has a left cutter, drive link, drive link, right cutter arrangement. It has one-third fewer cutting teeth and is generally used on long bars (≥24 in or 610 mm) for added chip clearance or when a bar longer than ideal for a given power head is used. Fewer teeth require less power to operate.

=== Semi-skip chain ===
Alternates having one or two drive links between pairs of cutters, for performance in between that of full complement and skip arrangements.

The terms used to describe chain arrangements can be confusing. Most modern chains do not have only cutter teeth and drive links. There are tie straps which separate the cutters from each other.

== Chain specifications and dimensioning ==
Cutting chain comes in a large number of configurations, but these are reduced to a few key dimensions for replacement or specification purposes.

=== Gauge ===
The gauge of the chain is the thickness of the drive links, and is dictated by the gauge of the bar on which it is to be run. Usual gauges are 0.043, 0.050, 0.058, 0.063 and 0.080 inches (1.1, 1.3, 1.5, 1.6 and 2.0 mm). Chain and bar gauge must match; a chain that is too large will not fit, one that is too small will fall sideways and cut poorly.

=== Pitch ===
The pitch of the chain is the average distance between two rivets. As the distance between rivets varies, the pitch can be measured by measuring between three rivets and dividing this distance by two. Typical pitches are 0.325, 0.375 and 0.404 inches (8.3, 9.5 and 10.3 mm). The 3/4-inch (19 mm) pitch is used for harvester applications, and very rarely for handheld cutting. The pitch of the chain must match the drive sprocket, and the nose sprocket (if fitted). Sprocket and rim can be in one unit or separated.

=== Length ===
A chain loop must be of an appropriate length in order to run safely. This is described by the number of drive links. This number is determined by the length and type of bar, the sprocket size and the overall configuration of the saw. For replacement purposes, simply count the drive links on the old chain.

=== Dulling of a chain ===
Chains will naturally dull over time with use. The friction cause by cutting wood gradually wears the chain's teeth down. However, the technique of use can also contribute to a chain dulling quickly. Cutting at too sharp an angle, cutting into dirt, and cutting frozen wood can prematurely dull your chain.

=== Life time of a chain ===
The teeth of a chain come with a certain length. Wear and sharpening cause the teeth to become shorter. End-of-life is reached when the top of the head is too short.

=== Interval between sharpenings ===
A saw chain must be sharpened when the saw starts to vibrate or cuts poorly. The operator can feel the vibrations in the handles and the engine runs harder while cutting.

=== Identification of the chain ===
The length, gauge and number of drive links is punched on the side of the saw bar. This information can be found near the saw head. Since the saw bar should be turned 180 degrees between sharpenings, the punched information can be towards the saw power head or outside. It is also often found on an identification label under the handle depending on your brand of chainsaw.

=== Identification of a suitable chain ===
Consult the saw's manual to determine which chain/bar combinations are compatible with the saw. A given saw will usually accept a number of different bars and chains.

== Specialised chains ==
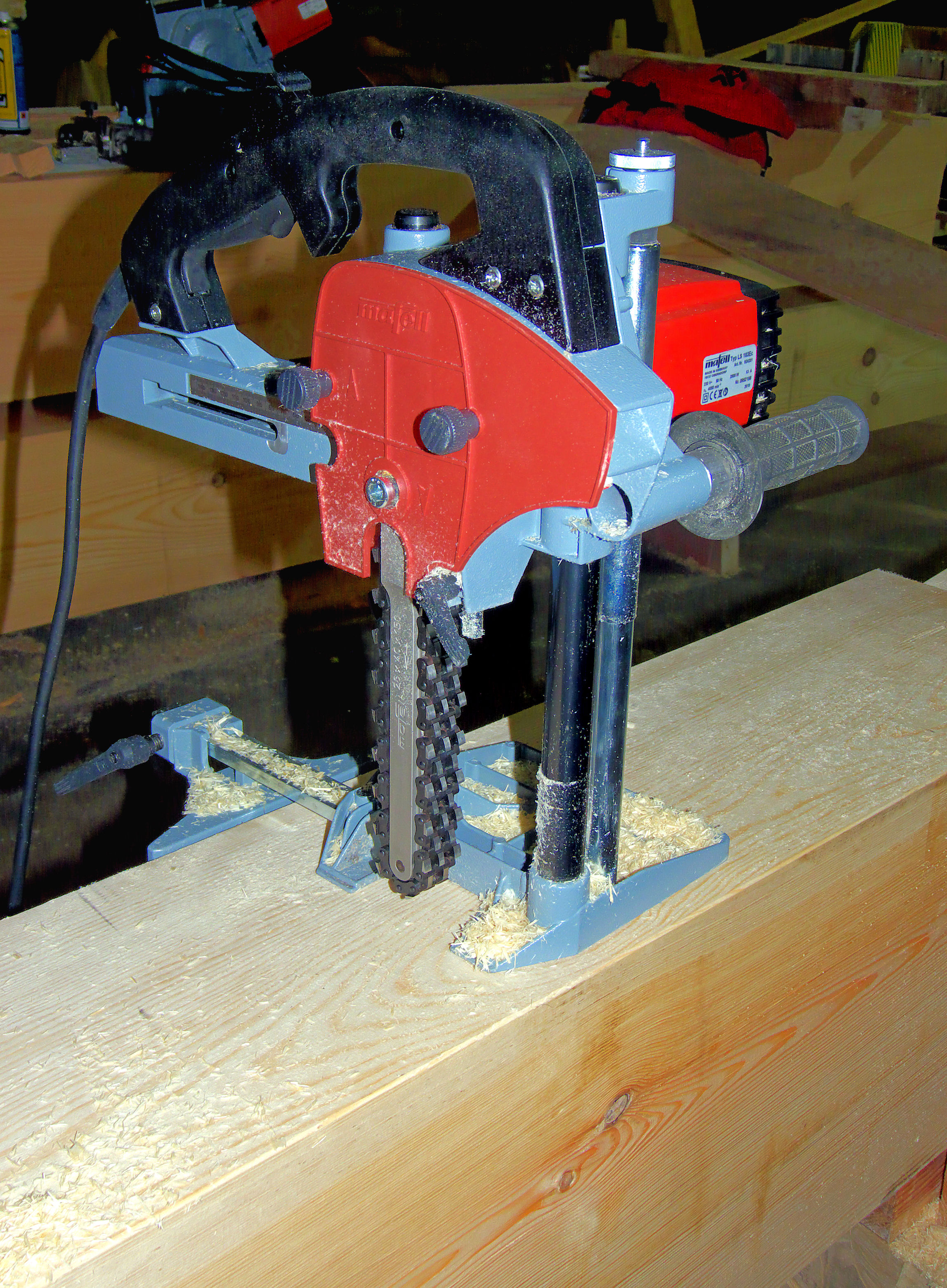
Chain mortiser

A number of very specialised chain types have emerged over recent years. These include chains made of steel alloys optimised for cutting in extremely cold conditions, chains with tungsten carbide teeth for very dirty conditions and rescue work, ripping chains with altered blade geometry for making ripping cuts, and milling chains for chainsaw mills.

Chain mortisers, used to cut the mortice of large mortice and tenon timber framing, use a number of chains, riveted side-by-side. They are used with a vertical tip-first plunge. Owing to the difficulty of resharpening the multiple teeth, these are usually made of long-lasting tungsten carbide.

== Joining chain ==
Chains are usually bought ready-joined to length, to suit a particular bar. All chainsaws have adjustable bar mounts to allow their chain tightness to be adjusted, allowing for any wear in the chain linkages. There is no requirement to remove links to shorten worn chains, chains will wear out on their cutting teeth before wear in their pivots becomes a problem. The adjustment also permits enough slack to allow a chain to be installed, so there is no need for a "split link" when fitting, as for bicycles.

Large scale operators and retail shops may buy bulk chain on reels. This must then be cut and joined to length which is done by inserting rivet pins. These non-reusable pins are usually supplied already installed into a half-link and must be peened over against a half-link on the other side. As this peening is done with a bench-mounted rotary tool, rather than hammering, it is referred to as "rivet spinning". The tool is usually hand-cranked, or may be electrically powered for mass production.

== See also ==
- Joseph Buford Cox, inventor of chipper saw chain.
- Chainsaw safety features
- Chainsaw safety clothing
