= Abbotsbury Subtropical Gardens =

Botanical garden in Abbotsbury, England

Coordinates: 50.6637°N 2.6187°W

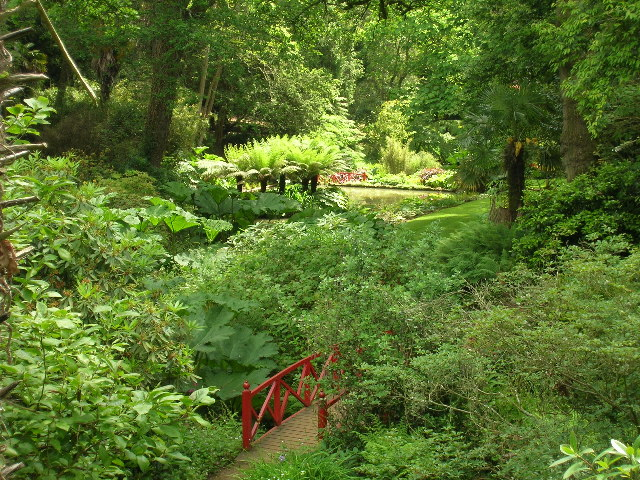
Abbotsbury Subtropical Gardens

The Abbotsbury Subtropical Gardens is a visitor attraction near the village of Abbotsbury, Dorset, southern England. They are Grade I listed in the National Register of Historic Parks and Gardens.

The garden originates in 1765. In the late eighteenth century, the Fox-Strangeways family (the Earls of Ilchester) built a new house on the location; when it was burnt down in 1913, they returned to their family seat at Melbury House, but the walled garden was maintained—it remains in the ownership of the family. Since then, particularly after the contributions of the 4th Earl of Ilchester, the gardens have developed into an 8 hectares (20 acres) site with exotic plants, many of which were newly discovered species when they were first introduced. There are formal and informal gardens, with woodland walks and walled gardens; in addition, the gardens also contain certain "zones" that exhibit plants from different geographical areas.

The gardens are in a wooded and sheltered valley, leading down towards the sea at Chesil Beach; this combination produces a microclimate in which more delicate plants than are usually grown in southern England can flourish, and plants that would otherwise need a greenhouses can be grown outside. However, in spite of its location, the plants remain vulnerable to bad winters, and the frost that they can bring; in 1990, violent storms damaged many of the rare specimens, which have since been replaced by younger plants. In 2010, Abbotsbury employed the chainsaw artist Matthew Crabb to carve a 200-year-old oak tree that had fallen after a particularly bad winter. The gardens won the Historic Houses Association/Christie’s Garden of the Year award for 2012, the first time that a subtropical garden has gained the award.

== See also ==
- Bennetts Water Gardens
