= Chainsaw safety features =

Chainsaws and chainsaw operations require specific risk control methods.

Chainsaws include numerous safety features common to many engine-driven power tools. Manufacturers have developed numerous design features to enhance safety. Some of these features have become de facto standards, while others are legally required in certain jurisdictions. It is best practice for operators to inspect the chainsaw before starting work and to ensure all safety features are functional before use.

Additional safety features are a significant commercial advantage to chainsaw producers. Companies continue to develop new features over time. Most chainsaw safety features are focused on the kickback problem, and seek to either avoid it (chain and bar design), or to reduce the risk of injury should it occur (chain brakes).

In addition to the safety features built into the chainsaw, operators should also wear specific chainsaw safety clothing. Most older saws have few or none of these features, and extra care should be taken in their use.

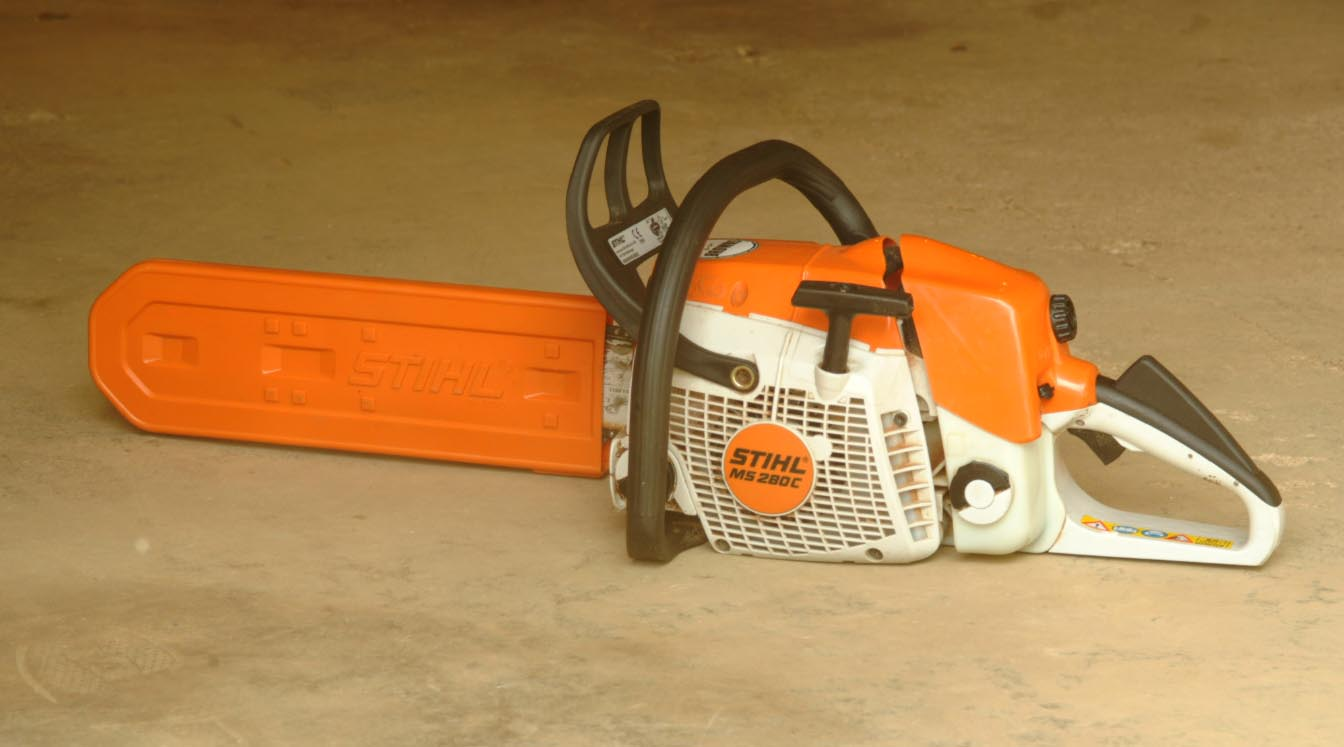
A chainsaw, with protective scabbard over the bar and chain

== Chain ==
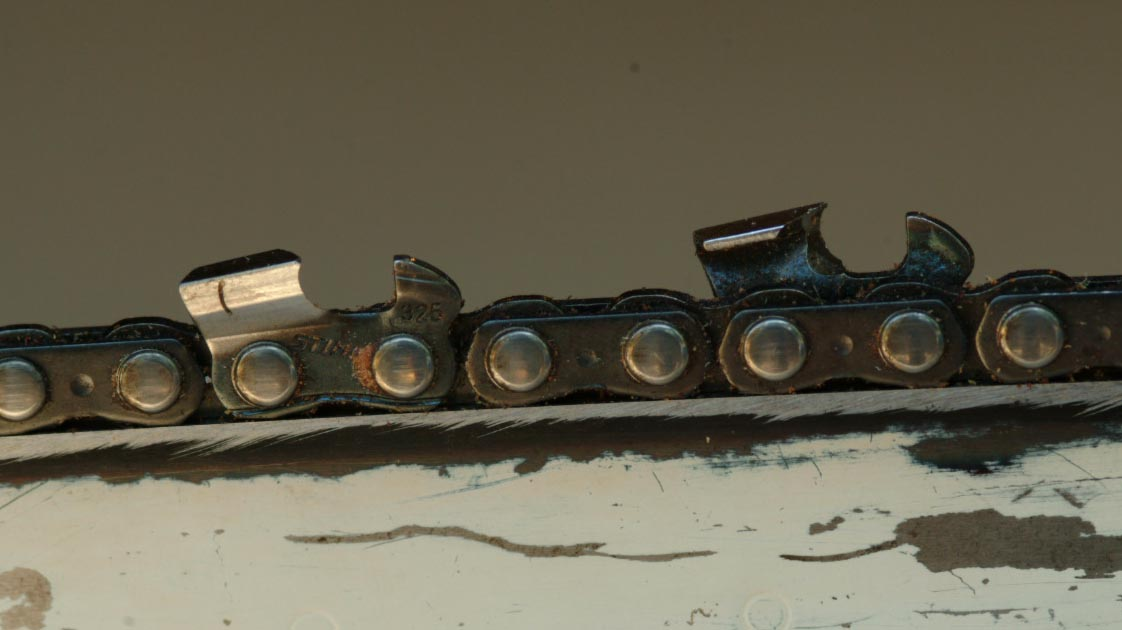
Full-chisel chain

The chain has to be properly matched to the guide bar and the saw. Chainsaw manufacturers specify a selection of suitable chains for each model of saw.

Best safety requires that the chain is properly sharpened. One key sharpening parameter is the depth gauge setting. The depth gauge is the small steel protuberance in front of each cutting tooth. The difference in height between the leading cutting edge and the depth gauge determines the thickness of the wood chip taken by the cutter. If the depth gauge is too low, the cutter takes too deep a bite from the wood, the saw becomes difficult to control and the chances of kickback increase.

Some chains also have guard links in front of each cutter link. The guard link reduces the tendency of the leading edge of the depth gauge to snag on small-diameter objects such as small branches, or to engage with ordinary timber if forced into contact with it.

== Chainsaw bars ==
=== Kickback reduction ===
Kickback is primarily caused by cutting with the chain in the "kickback zone" on the bar, the upper quarter of the nose. Some saws, usually electric saws intended for domestic garden use, shield this whole area from contact with a "tip protector". All cutting produces a reaction force on the saw: normally this should be the lower edge of the bar, where the chain is travelling towards the saw and the reaction tends to pull the saw safely towards the log, against the spur dogs. Where the chain is moving downwards, as at the tip of the bar, the same reaction force now acts upwards and will cause a kickback upwards.

Tip protectors are metal or plastic devices that fit over the bar tip and are usually fitted to small, domestic-class saws. While these are effective, they hamper the saw in terms of the type and capacity of cuts it can execute, and are not widely used. They find a useful application in pole pruners and one-handed battery-powered saws that are used for trimming, hedge laying etc. The hooked nose of the tip protector can be used to "grab" branches for cutting, and presents no great drawback since these very small saw units are not used for cuts where the bar tip is buried.

=== Carving bars ===
Chainsaw carving often makes deliberate use of plunge cuts, and cuts on the tip of the bar. By simply reducing the diameter of the chain nose, the amount of chain, and thus the force generated during a kickback, may be reduced. Specialist carving bars are available with small pointed noses.

== Chain brake ==
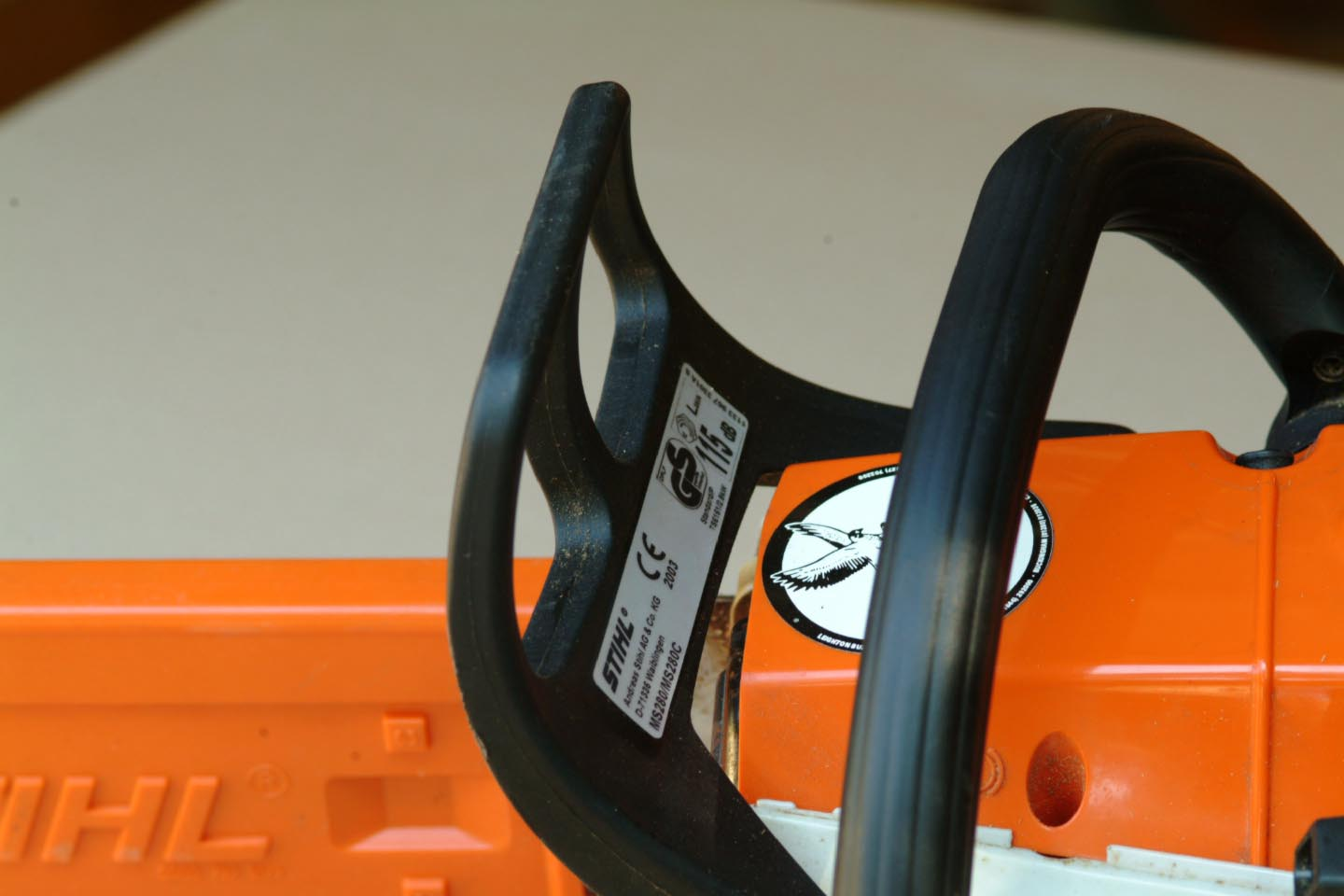
Front handguard, and combined chain brake lever

Chain brakes prevent movement of the saw's cutting chain by applying a steel brake band around the driven clutch drum. Clamping force for the brake band is provided by a powerful spring. The chain brake has two purposes. First, it can be used to secure the chain when changing position, moving between cuts or starting a cold saw, which requires a partly open throttle. This would otherwise lead to uncontrolled chain movement, a major hazard in older saws. Secondly, the chain brake can activate under kickback conditions to prevent the operator from being struck by a running chain. Being struck by even a static chain may cause serious injury, but anything that can be done to mitigate the usually dreadful injuries caused by contact with a moving chain is of considerable benefit to operators. Kickback injuries usually occur to the head, face, neck and shoulders; when a running chain is involved, such injuries are usually very serious, often disfiguring and sometimes fatal.

The chain brake is principally operated by the top-hand guard being pushed forward to engage the brake, and pulled back to disengage. The spring-loaded action allows powerful braking under emergency conditions and can halt a chain under full power in a fraction of a second. Correspondingly, it may require considerable force to reset.

The chain brake may be activated deliberately by the operator, or automatically by the force of a kickback event. In the former, the operator usually rotates his left wrist and knocks the top hand guard forward with the back of his hand, re-setting it by reaching forward with his fingers to pull the top hand guard backwards. In the case of a kickback event the operator's left hand may be violently dislodged from the handle and the top hand guard will be thrown onto his hand, forcing activation of the chain brake. Husqvarna models also incorporate a link between the top handle and the chain brake trigger, applying the brake if the saw's bar is forced suddenly upwards. This is known as an "inertia" chain brake and will allow activation of the chain brake even if the operator's left hand is not removed from the handle.

The chain brake may also be of use when sharpening a chain on a bar, as it allows robust filing to take place without the chain slipping about.

"Wrap-around" top-hand guards restrict movement and make no allowance for the fact that when the handle is gripped on the lower section of the handle (left side of the saw from the operator's viewpoint) it is usually for making lateral, right-to-left cuts. In this situation the operator's head, neck and shoulders are out of the cutting plane of the saw and will generally not be struck even if a kickback does occur.

=== Chainsaw kickback ===
Chainsaw kickback can occur when the tip of the bar comes into contact with a relatively massive or immovable object with the chain under power. The area of the bar tip most likely to be involved is known as the "kickback quarter". Looking from the side of the bar, the kickback quarter is the 90° section of bar found between a line going along the centreline of the bar, and another line at 90° to the first, rising upwards from the centre of the nose sprocket. If this area of chain comes into contact with—for instance—a log, the chain will initially cut the wood, but will also produce a reaction force which pushes the bar upwards. As the bar rises, the chain is forced harder into contact with the wood and climbs upwards even harder. In a fraction of a second the chain may jam hard into the wood and hurl the bar upwards towards the operator, often causing very severe injury or death. The suddenness of a full kickback event is such that no evasive action is possible, and if the operator's head, neck or shoulders are in line with the plane of the bar, they will certainly be struck by it. At this point, the operator must rely on the chain brake and protective equipment / clothing to save them from injury or worse.

Another form of kickback may occur where the top of the bar is used for cutting and becomes suddenly pinched by the wood moving. In this case the saw may be forced backwards towards the operator, or forced into a position where the tip is pinched and the saw transitions into a classic tip-driven kickback. Kickback may also occur as a result of a failed or improperly executed boring cut. Bore cutting is a specialised technique requiring proper training, and should not be attempted without such training.

=== Kickback reducing systems ===
By far the most effective tool in preventing kickback is operator training. By preventing contact between the bar tip and solid objects, kickback may be avoided. By keeping their head and body out of the cutting plane of the bar, injury may be prevented if kickback occurs. A useful tip is that if the operator cannot read the logo on the side of the bar, they are too close to the cutting plane and should lean left to ensure safety.

Correct chain sharpening is paramount to safety in this context. Blunt chain cuts poorly and leads to increased operator fatigue and increased bar loading. Depth gauges filed too low make the chain grab at the wood and may negate the benefits offered by safety chain.

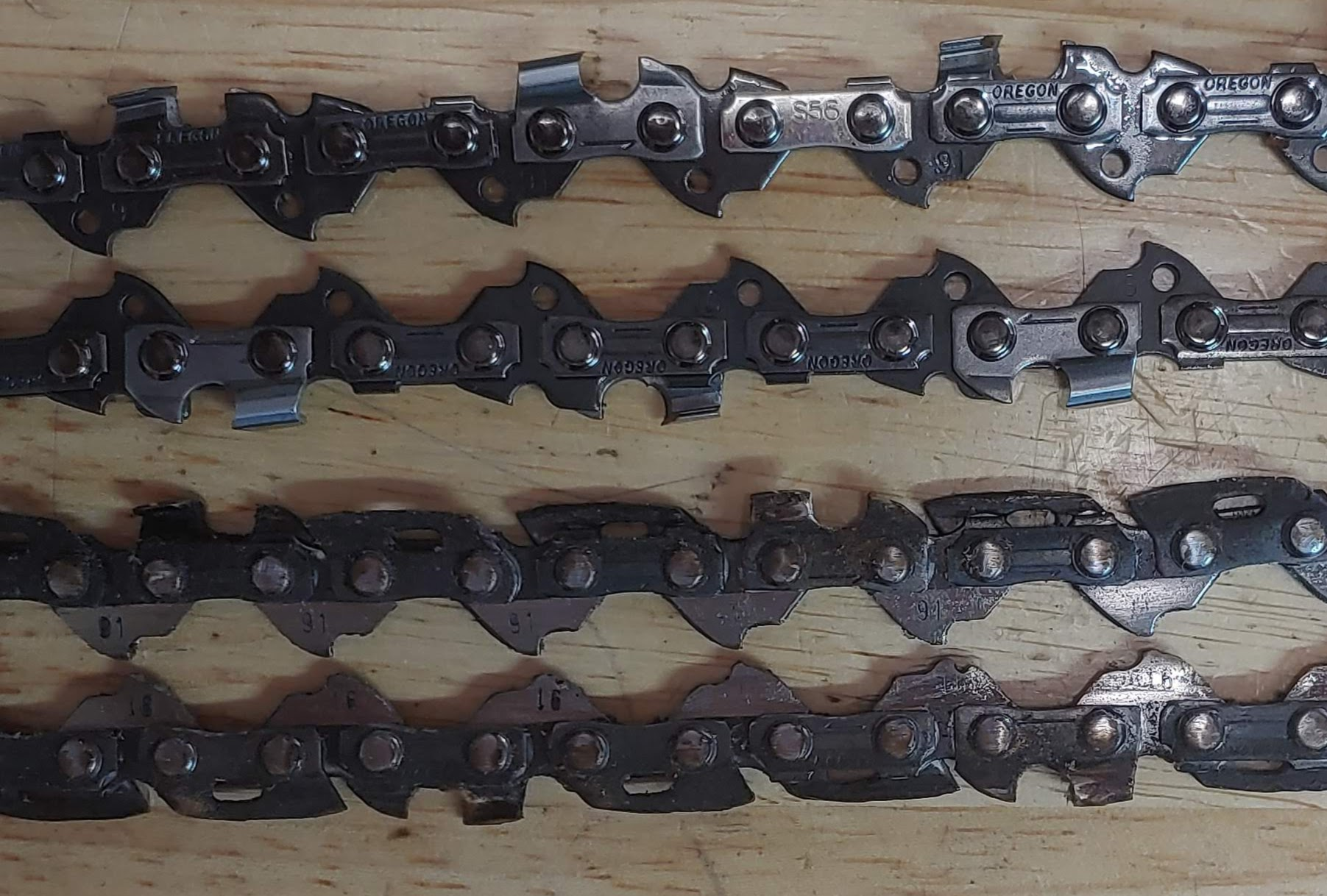
Two low kickback chainsaw chains. The upper chain uses the newer bumper drive link design to reduce kickback. The lower chain uses the older bumper tie strap design to reduce kickback.

Chain design plays a major part in kickback reduction. Older, non-safety designs carried only teeth and depth gauges. Since these present a solid leading edge at the depth gauge should an object be suddenly forced into the chain, they can easily be made to engage fully with the foreign body and launch into a full kickback. Careful filing of the depth gauges, making a radius down to the leading edge, reduces the risk somewhat. Newer chains with ramped drive links fill in the gap ahead of the depth gauge, reducing the tendency to grab still further. Full safety chains have extra bumper links between the cutting links, maintaining nearly full depth gauge height along the full extent of the chain and reducing the risk of kickback to very low levels. Full safety (bumpered) chains are often fitted as original equipment to domestic and entry level saws. Modern "professional" chains offer far higher cutting performance than full safety chain, and offset their increased risk with an assumption of a much higher degree of operator competence. In reality they are still safer than traditional chains due to the vastly improved depth gauge design, with a deep ramp ahead of the gauge point.

Bar design is another factor in reducing kickback risk. The larger the radius of the bar tip, the greater the risk of kickback as the degree of engagement with the log (or other body) will be greater for a larger tip. Domestic class bars, climbing saw bars and entry-level professional bars usually have very small tips. Professional bars designed for logging and felling may have much larger tips as they are often used for boring cuts to free trapped timber or fell difficult trees, and a tapered, small-tipped bar will wedge easily when boring, stalling the chain. A large-tipped bar with nearly parallel sides bores easily and does not tend to jam.

While kickback prevention is a great concern in the context of chainsaw use, it is not the only means by which an operator can be injured by a saw. Local conditions, operator competence and many other factors need to be considered before undertaking sawing operations.

== Chain catcher ==
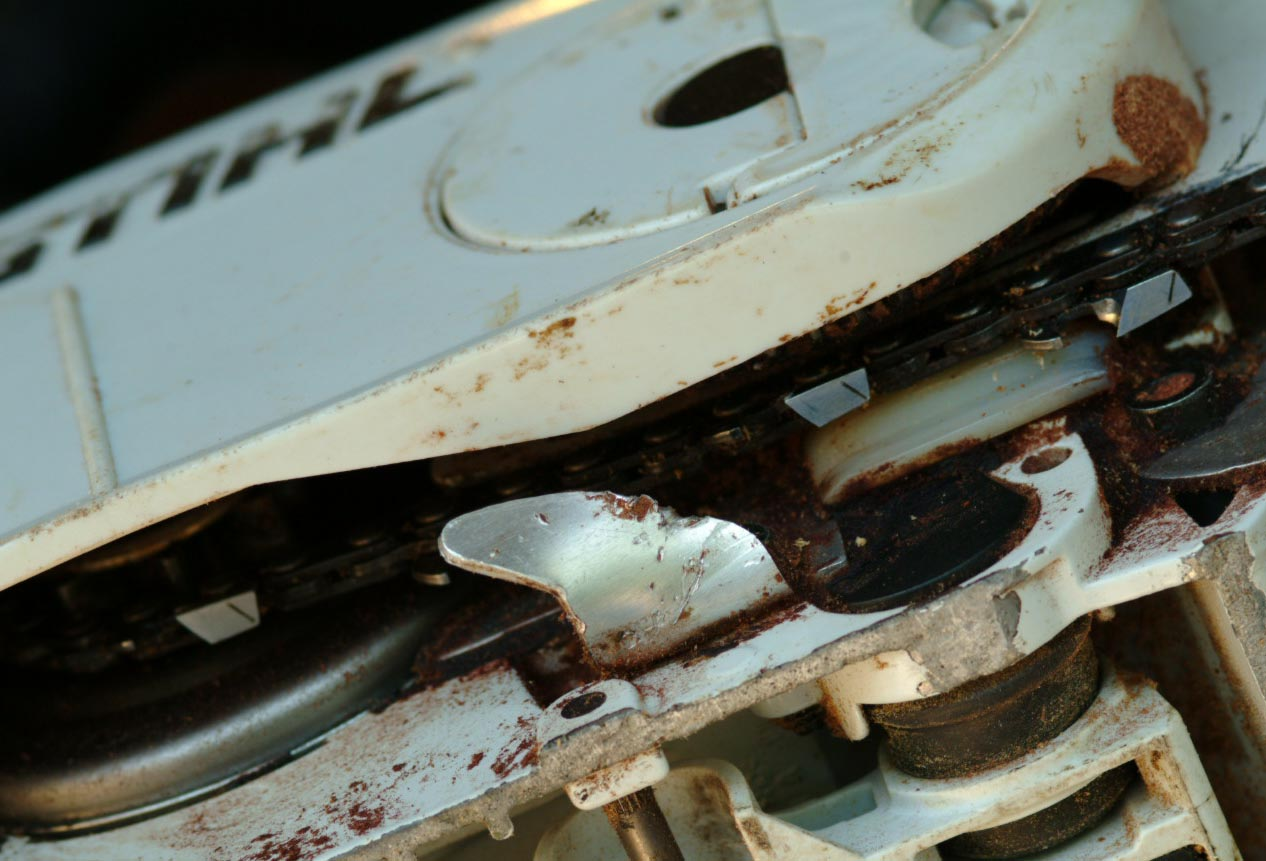
Chain catcher

The chain catcher helps prevent the chain being thrown back towards the user, if the chain breaks or becomes derailed. The catcher catches the chain when it derails downwards and shortens it. Then the chain moves underneath the saw body smashing against the rear hand protection at the rear handle (The bottom of the handle is wider to the back side as to the other). As shown in the image, chain catchers are made of aluminum so as to not damage the chain. A worn out chain catcher can be changed.

== Safety throttle ==
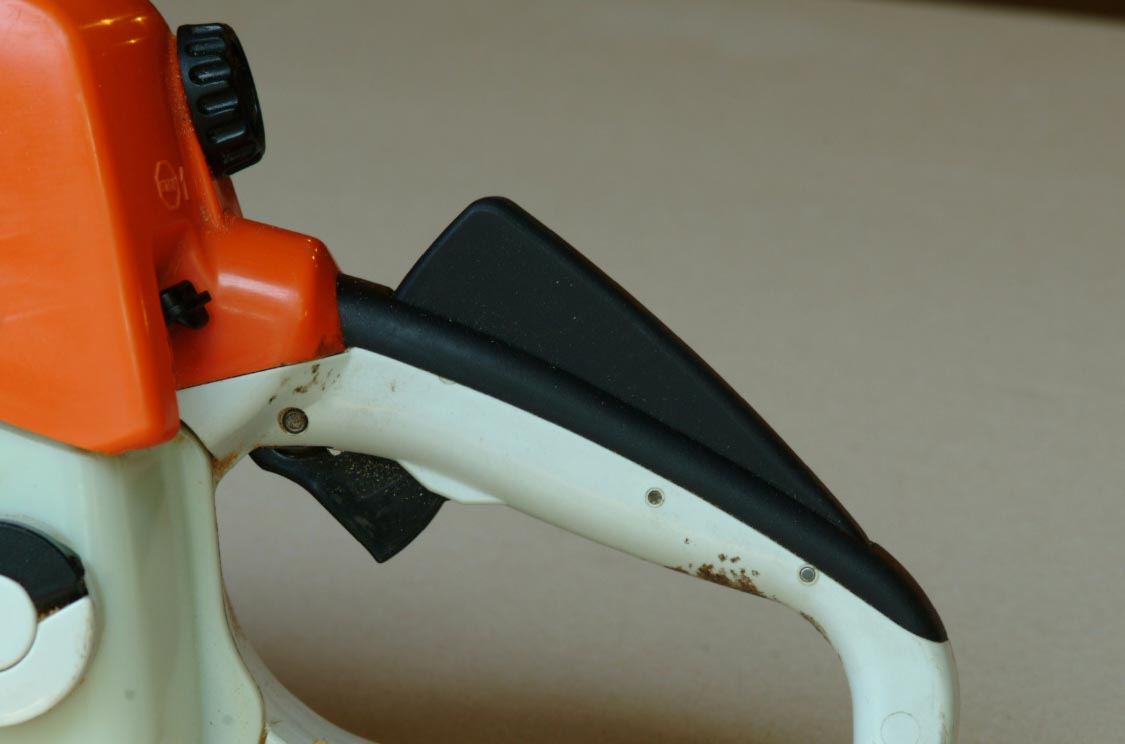
Safety throttle

The engine throttle is operated by the trigger under the rear handle of the saw. Unless the lock-out switch above the rear handle is also pressed, the throttle cannot move from the idle position, and the chain will not be driven.

The safety throttle prevents the chain from being driven if the trigger is accidentally pushed by an obstruction, such as a branch in undergrowth. It also prevents throttle activation when hot-starting a saw on the ground with one boot inside the rear handle. The safety throttle is an additional layer of protection in this case, since the chain brake should be applied before starting a saw in any context.

The pictured model has an enlarged lock-out or 'dead man' switch which, when released, also activates the chain brake, thus instantly halting the running chain as well as disengaging the throttle. When needed the lock can be bypassed with a zip tie.

== On/Off switch ==
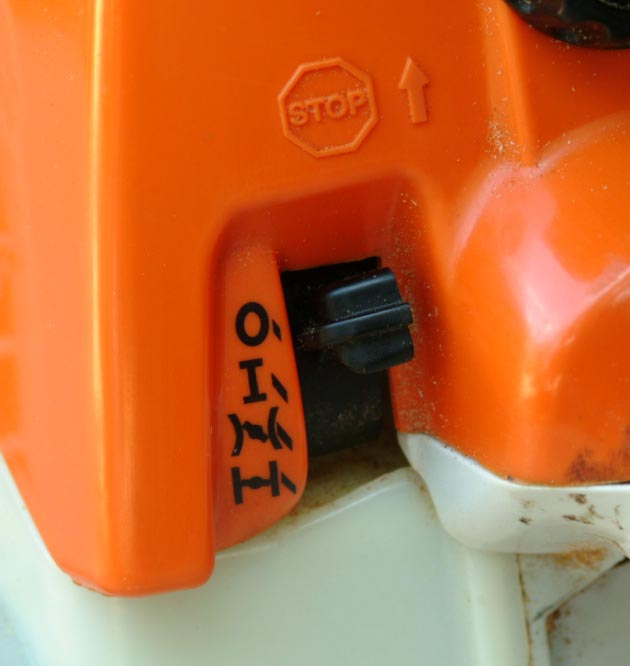
On/off switch

In a gas-powered chainsaw, the on/off switch stops the engine running by preventing the ignition coil from firing. This switch is also called kill switch. It must be clearly marked with the stop position. There must be a positive click action, so that there is no chance that the switch will change position accidentally, even while the saw is vibrating under heavy load.

If the switch were to move to the off position while the operator was in the middle of a critical cut while felling a tree, there would at least be a delay, which increases the chance that the tree might fall in an uncontrolled manner. Also, the saw might jam in the cut, requiring that the operator spend extra time under the unsafe tree freeing it. A switch failing "on" would also present a hazard, since the saw may then start inappropriately, such as when testing compression or assessing starter function.

If the operator is injured while using the saw, a bystander might have to move in to turn the saw off. The bystander may be unfamiliar with the saw and needs to be able to identify the on/off switch by its markings.

The STIHL model shown combines the choke, throttle start setting and ignition switch into one unified control lever. Other brands of saw usually have separate controls for all three, or a combined throttle start setting and choke control with a separate ignition switch.

If the OFF switch fails to operate, a saw may be reliably stopped by operating the choke control to flood the engine.

== Centrifugal clutch ==
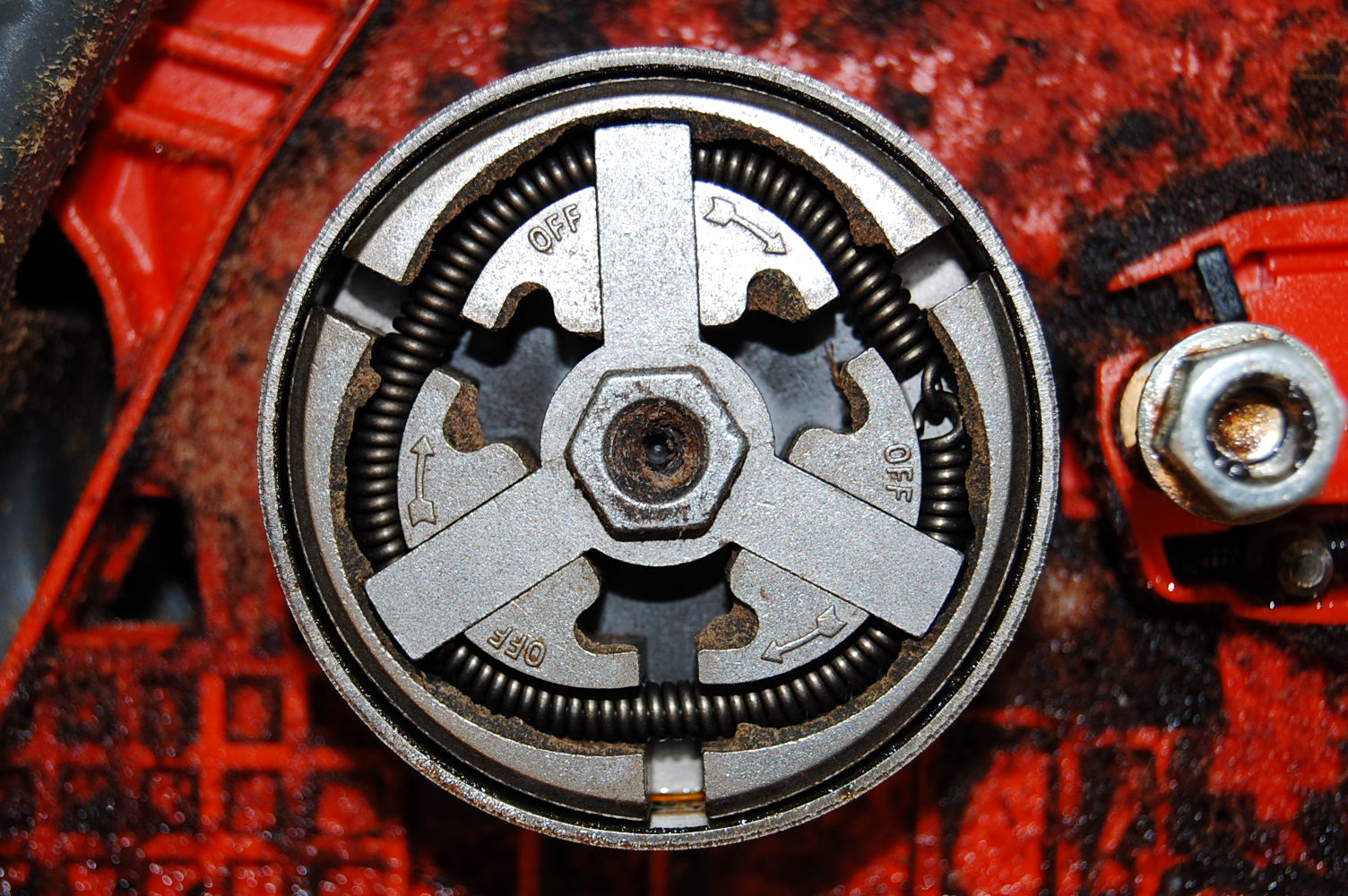
Centrifugal clutch

The centrifugal clutch disengages the chain from the engine when the engine is only at idling speed, engaging the drive automatically when the throttle is squeezed and the engine is at full speed. The purpose of this clutch is to avoid having a moving chain when the saw is idling and temporarily not cutting. At idle the chain should not move.

Many rear-handled chainsaws are used in a state, owing to poor maintenance, where there is some clutch drag and so the chain does move slowly at idle. For top-handled saws though, this is extremely dangerous and the clutch (and chain brake) on such a saw must always be functioning correctly.

Some early chainsaws used a manual clutch instead, but this is long obsolete.

== Anti-vibration and heating systems ==
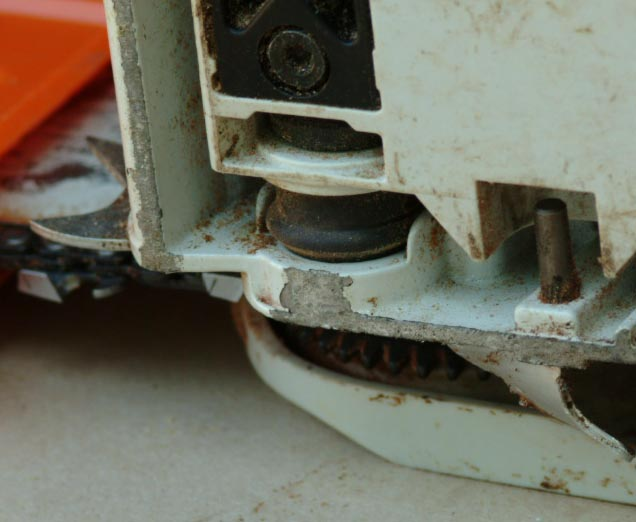
Rubber bush

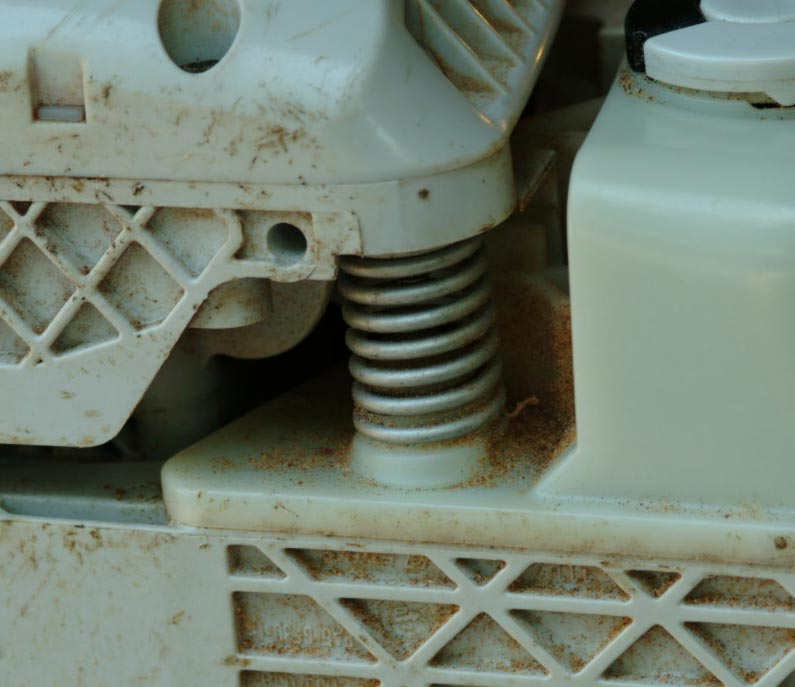
Metal spring

Excessive vibration over long periods can cause the user to develop hand-arm vibration syndrome (HAVS), or white finger. This is a potentially permanent and debilitating industrial injury. To reduce vibration, saws are divided into two parts. One part is a rigid assembly of the cutter bar and engine. This part vibrates strongly when the chain is cutting. The other part is a rigid assembly of the handles and controls of the machine, the part the user holds. These two rigid assemblies are joined together by mounts which provide spring suspension and damping.

Both metal springs and rubber bushes can be used to provide suspension. Metal springs are more robust and longer wearing, but rubber bushes provide damping in addition to a spring action.

Many modern saws incorporate electrically heated handles. This can help prevent HAVS by encouraging circulation to the fingers. Husqvarna models with this option have a "G" suffix after the model number, STIHL have "W" or "VW", and Dolmar saws an "H".

== Rear handle ==
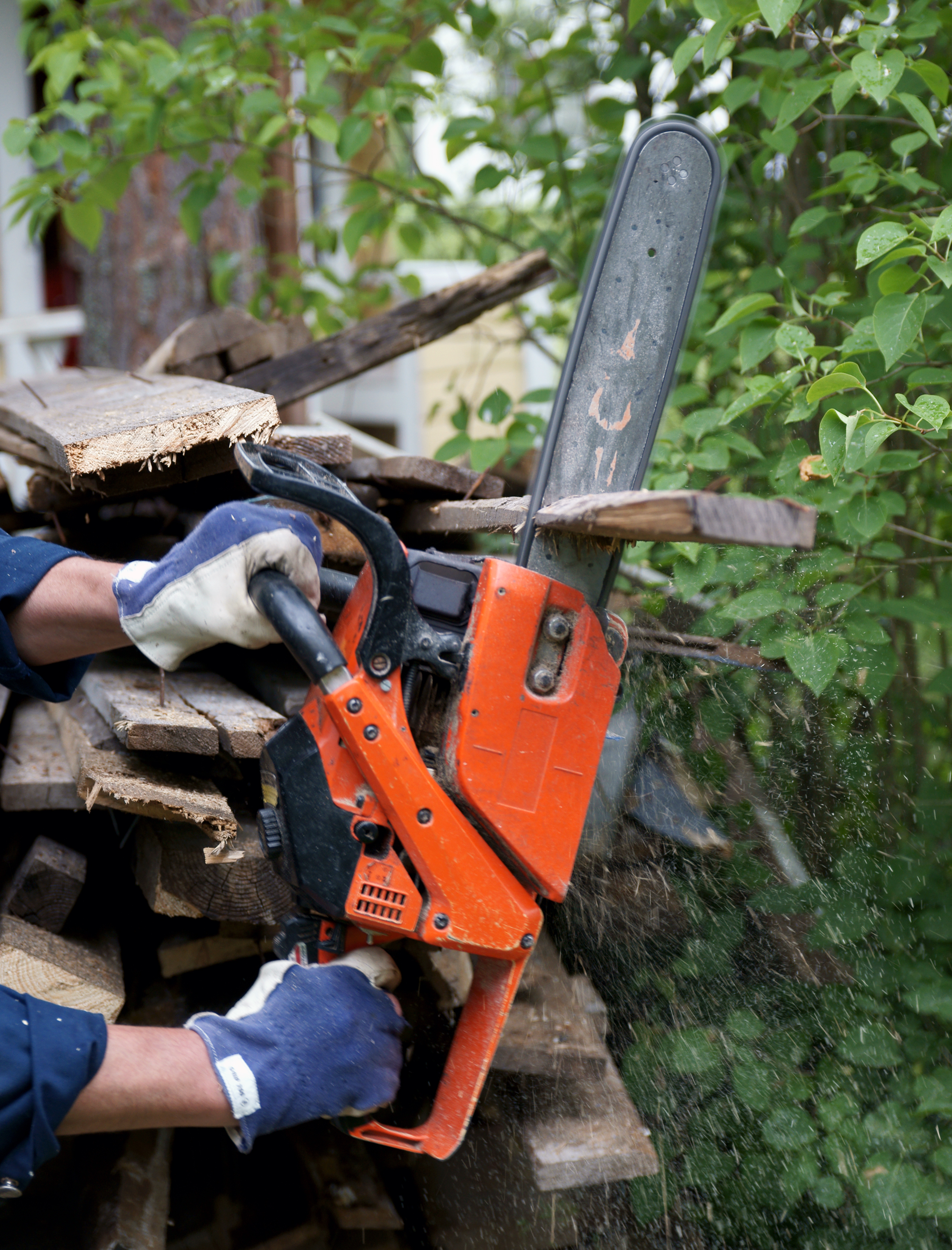
Rear-handled chainsaw and two-handed grip

The front and rear handles of a typical "rear handle" chainsaw are widely spaced, so as to provide enough leverage for good control, and also to provide some degree of control in the event of a kickback.

The operating controls of the chainsaw, such as the throttle and the engine stop (or on/off) switch, are placed so that they may operated whilst retaining a good grip on the rear handle.

It is impossible to use a rear-handled chainsaw single-handed. Their balance is such that this is not merely unwise, but so impractical as to be beyond a reasonable chance of it even being attempted.

=== Top-handled chainsaws ===
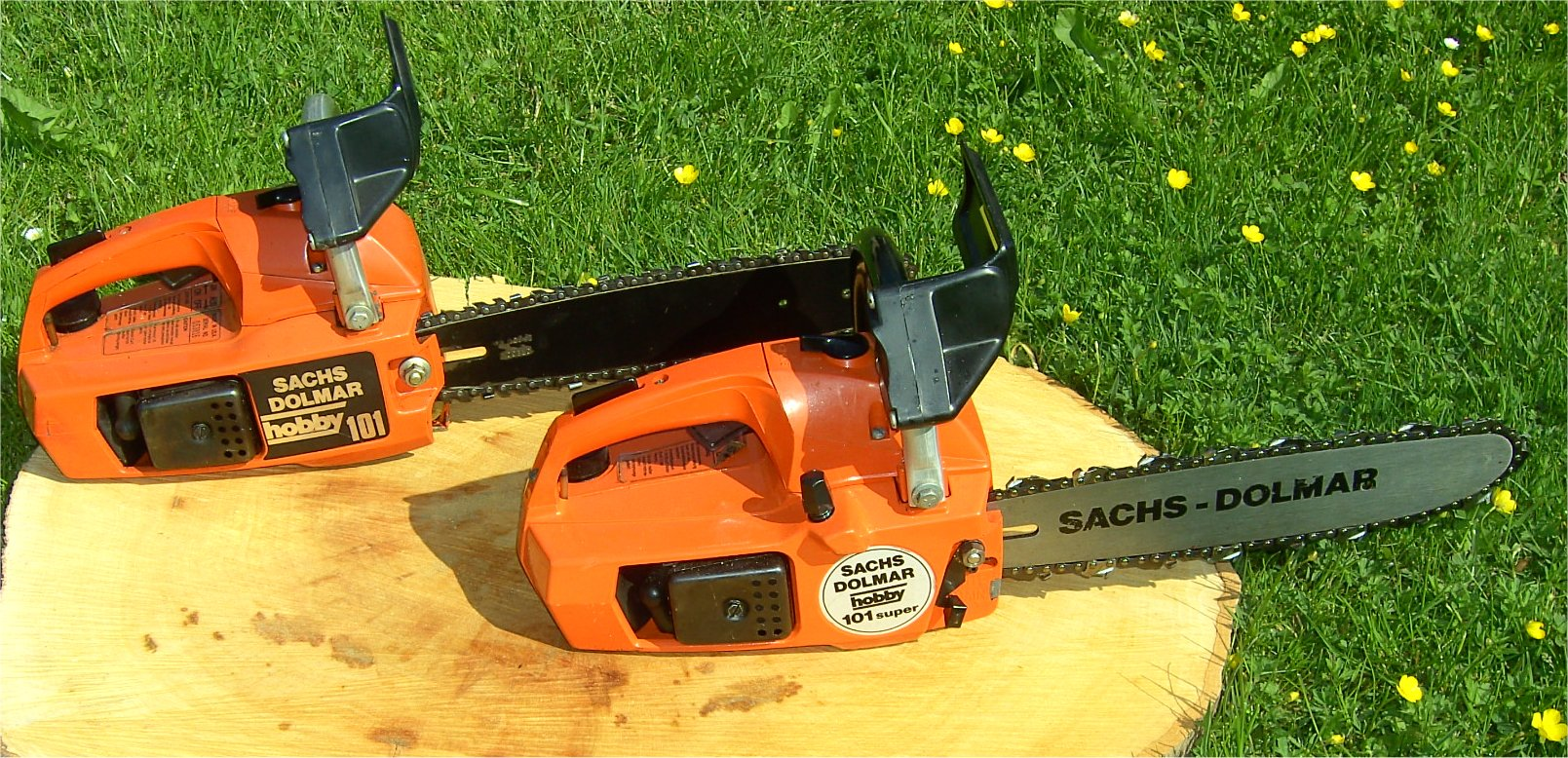
Top-handled chainsaws

Top-handled chainsaws are a form of chainsaw whose safety is deliberately compromised in order to permit them being used single-handed where this is essential. They are restricted to working at height, such as up a tree. In all other cases, it should be possible to arrange the cutting task so that it can instead be carried out with two hands and the safer rear-handled chainsaw.

In the top-handled saw, the rear handle and its operating controls are moved to the top of the saw. This gives a balance to the saw such that it can now be used one-handed. The front handle remains the same. The chain brake lever is usually separate, rather than being combined into the protective hand guard.

In most cases, the top-handled chainsaw is used two-handed. It is only used single-handed when this is essential, such as when one hand is required for climbing. At ground-level, top-handled saws should not be used.

Owing to the nature of work at height, and the difficulty of continually restarting the saw, the engine will often still be running when it is not used for cutting at that moment. For this reason it is particularly important that the centrifugal clutch is operating correctly so that the chain does not rotate when the engine is idling. The chain brake should also be engaged manually when not actually required, which is why top-handled saws usually have an easy brake control lever.

In many jurisdictions, use and even purchase of top-handled chainsaws is restricted to those holding the relevant certificate of competence in their use. However in the United States and New Zealand such saws may be freely purchased and used.

=== Rear hand guard ===
The rear hand guard protects the users right hand from being struck by a snapped or derailed chain. It also allows the rear of the saw to be held down by the operator's boot for starting. This is especially useful for cold engines, and larger (70 cc+) saws.

== Handedness ==
The majority of chainsaws are designed to be used by a right handed person. Using such a chainsaw in a left hand way constitutes an additional safety hazard. A left handed person should learn to use it in a right-handed way. There are no manufactured left hand user chainsaws.

== Exhaust ==
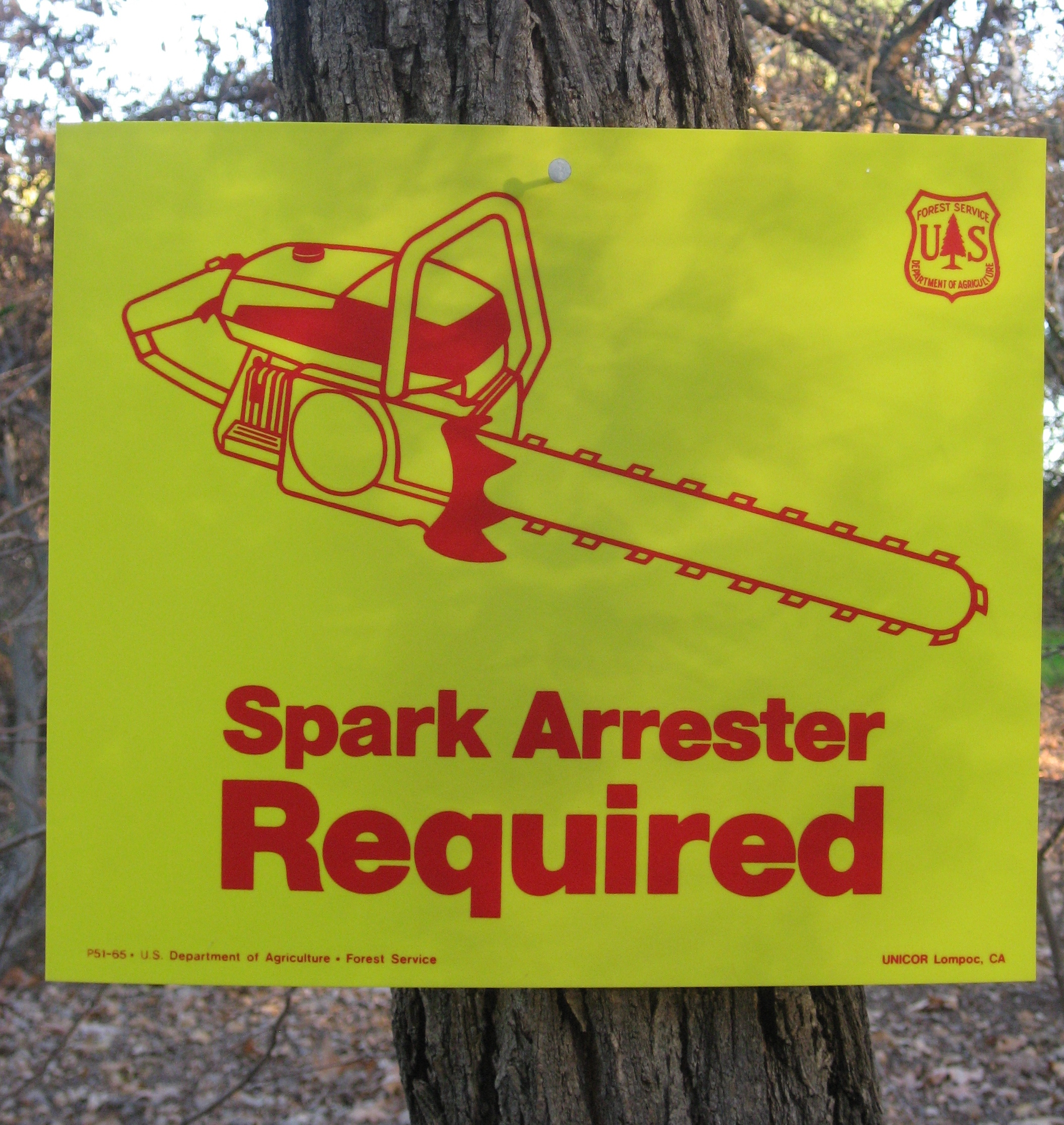
Warning sign for mandatory use of spark arresters

The exhaust directs the hot and noxious gases coming from the engine away from the user. A faulty exhaust increases noise, decreases engine power, can expose the user to unsafe levels of exhaust gases, and can increase the chance that the user could accidentally touch extremely hot metal. Most models feature a spark screen which is integrated into the muffler. The spark screen prevents sparks from being discharged from the exhaust and potentially igniting sawdust. The spark screen also reduces noise.

== Hand/eye/ear defender symbols ==
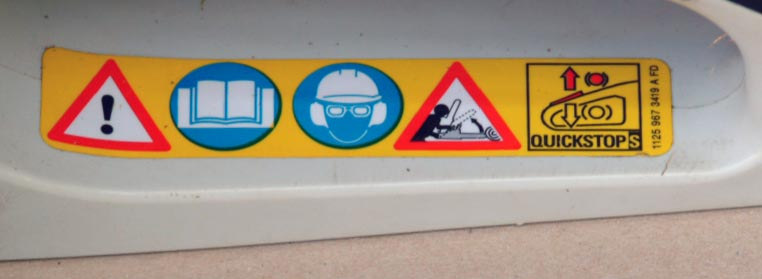
Warning labels

In the EU, and some other jurisdictions, it is a legal requirement that chainsaws carry certain standardized warning labels which warn of the dangers of kickback as well as making clear the need for protective clothing.

== Scabbard ==
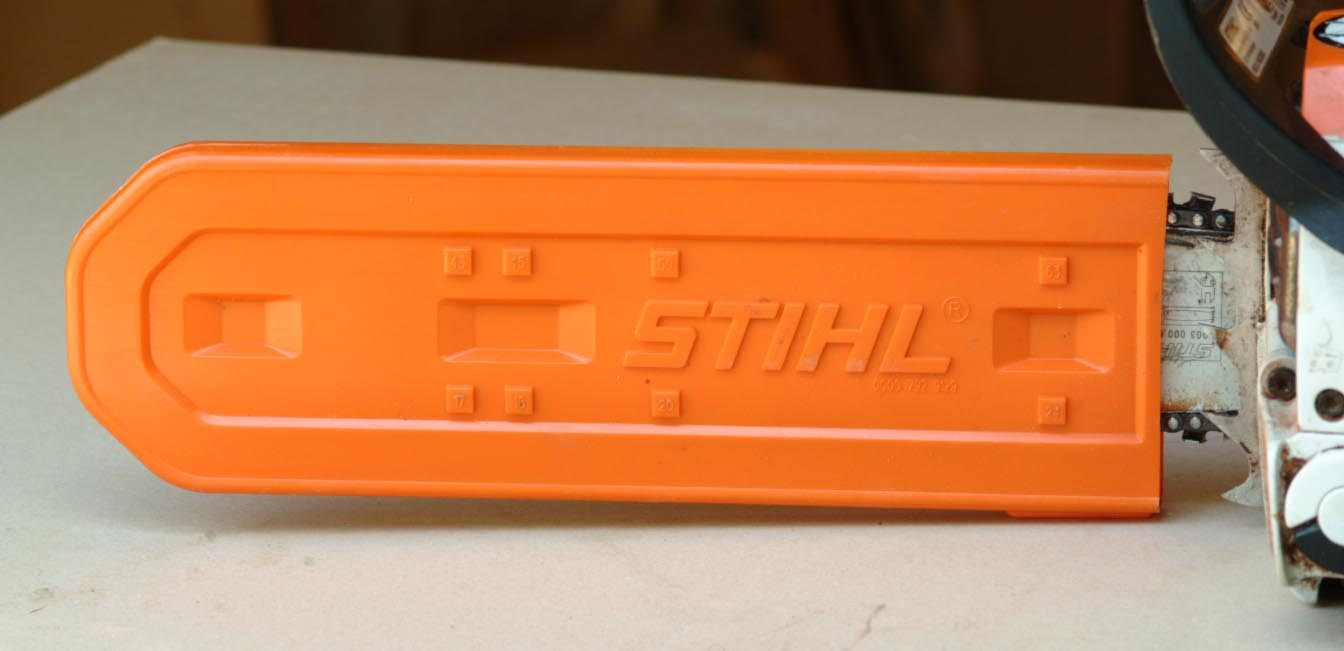
Scabbard

The cutter chain is sharp enough to cause injury even when it is not being driven. The scabbard covers the chain when the saw is in storage or being transported. It also protects the chain from damage, for instance blunting by contact with concrete floors.
