= Hypothenar hammer syndrome =

- Symptoms: Pain over the hypothenar eminence especially at the ring finger, though all fingers of the same hand may be affected (thumb is never affected); increased sensitivity to cold and reduced sense of touch in affected digits
- Causes: multiple trauma of the fingers leading to Ischemia., Smoking, type of occupation: example carpenters, polishers, builders.
- Risk factors: Regular use of vibrating tools (carpenters, mechanics, machinists) and a subset of athletics involving repeated high-impact on the hand (baseball catchers, golfers, karate, volleyball)
- Treatment: Nonoperative: cessation of smoking, avoid recurrent trauma; operative: endovascular fibrinolysis, excision of involved segment and reconstruction with or without a vein graft, and arterial ligation

Hypothenar hammer syndrome (HHS) is a vascular occlusion in humans in the region of the ulna. It is caused by repetitive trauma to the hand or wrist (such as that caused by the use of the hand as a hammer) by the vulnerable portion of the ulnar artery as it passes over the hamate bone, which may result in thrombosis, irregularity or aneurysm formation. HHS is a potentially curable cause of Raynaud's syndrome, distinct from hand–arm vibration syndrome.

== Diagnosis ==
A physical examination of the hand may show discoloration (blanching, mottling, and/ or cyanosis; gangrene may be present in advanced cases), unusual tenderness/ a callous over the hypothenar eminence, and fingertip ulcerations and splinter hemorrhages over ulnar digits; if an aneurysm is present, there may also be a pulsatile mass. Allen's test will be positive if an occlusion is present and negative if an aneurysm is present. An angiogram may show a "corkscrew" ulnar artery or an occlusion or aneurysm at the hook of the hamate.

== Treatment ==
Noninvasive treatments have an 80% success rate; Example: switch jobs, stop smoking, regular finger exercise, surgical options exist for other instances.

== Epidemiology ==
HHS, though rare, occurs much more frequently in men than in women (9:1) and principally affects those in their 40s and 50s.
