= List of chainsaw carving competitions =

Chainsaw carving competitions are competitive events held all over the world where contestants display their skills in the act of chainsaw carving.

== Australia ==
- Australian Chainsaw Carving Championship, Melbourne

== Canada ==
- Chetwynd (International) Chainsaw Carving Competition (Championship), Chetwynd, British Columbia held annually since 2005
- Brigade Days/Hope Chainsaw Carving Competition, Hope, British Columbia, biannually
- Prince George Chain Saw Carving Competition, Prince George, British Columbia

== Japan ==
- Tōei, Aichi, since 2001

== United Kingdom ==
- Carve Carrbridge, Carrbridge, Scotland, held annually since 2003
- English Open Chainsaw Carving Competition, Tatton Park, Cheshire, England, since 2005

== United States ==
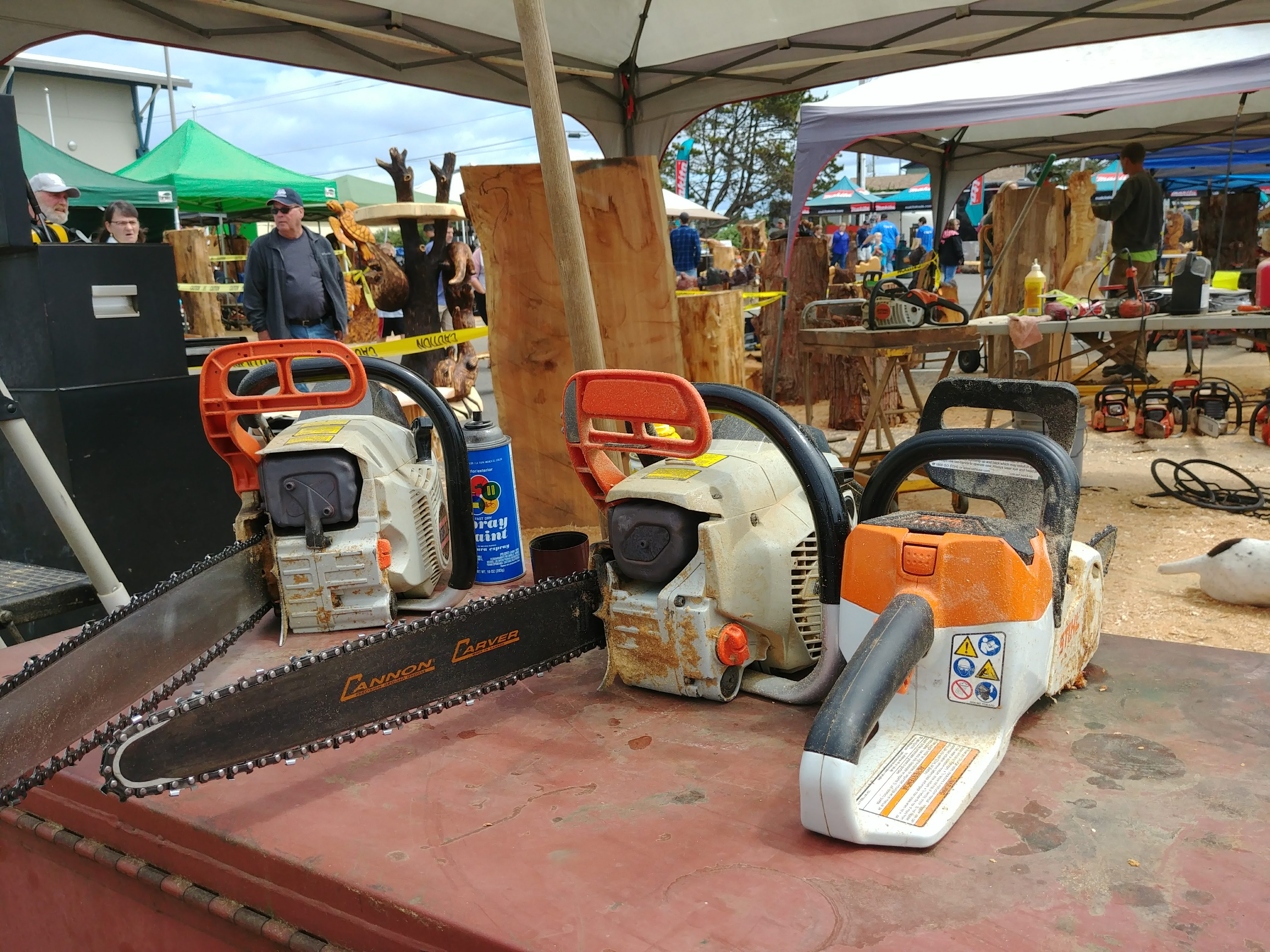
Tools of the trade at a chainsaw carving demonstration and competition held in Ocean Shores, Washington

=== Arkansas ===
- Arkansas State Championship Chainsaw Carving Competition, Russellville, Arkansas, annually since 2021 on the first weekend of May each year as part of Balloons over Russellville

=== Alaska ===
- Seldovia Craft Invitational Chainsaw Competition, Seldovia, Alaska, annually since 2006

=== Montana ===
- Kootenai Country Montana International Chainsaw Carving Championship, Libby, Montana

=== Oregon ===
- Reedsport Chainsaw Carving Competition/Oregon Divisional Chainsaw Sculpting Championship, Reedsport, Oregon, held annually since 2000

=== Pennsylvania ===
- Chainsaw Carvers Rendezvous, Ridgway, Pennsylvania, held annually since 2000

=== Washington ===
- Burning Bear, Ocean City, Washington
- Sedro Woolley Loggerodeo Longest running 4th of July Celebration in Washington State, Sedro Woolley, Washington, since before 1999
- Sequim Irrigation Fest, Sequim, Washington, featuring Logging Show since 1989
- Sand and Sawdust, Ocean Shores, Washington
- Texas Chainsaw Pumpkin Carving Contest, Fremont Oktoberfest in Seattle since before 2005, draws 30,000 spectators

=== Wisconsin ===
- US Open Chainsaw Sculpture Championship, Eau Claire, Wisconsin
