= Hand arm vibrations =

Occupational hazard from overusing handheld machinery

A video describing research done on hand–arm vibration

In occupational safety and health, hand arm vibrations (HAVs) are a specific type of occupational hazard which can lead to hand–arm vibration syndrome (HAVS). HAVS, also known as vibration white finger (VWF) or dead finger, is an industrial injury triggered by continuous use of vibrating hand-held machinery and constituting a secondary form of Raynaud's syndrome. Use of the term vibration white finger has generally been superseded in professional usage by the broader descriptor HAVS, although it is still used by the general public. The symptoms of vibration white finger are the vascular component of HAVS.

Hand-arm vibration syndrome is a widespread recognized industrial disease affecting tens of thousands of workers. It is a disorder that affects the blood vessels, nerves, muscles, and joints of the hand, wrist, and arm. Its best known effect is vibration-induced white finger (VWF), a term introduced by the Industrial Injury Advisory Council in 1970. Injury can occur at frequencies between 5 and 2000 Hz but the greatest risk for fingers is between 50 and 300 Hz. The total risk exposure for hand and arm is calculated by the use of ISO 5349-1, which stipulates maximum damage between 8 and 16 Hz and a rapidly declining risk at higher frequencies. The ISO 5349-1 frequency risk assessment has been criticized as corresponding poorly to observational data; more recent research suggests that medium and high frequency vibrations also increase HAVS risk.

== Hand-arm vibration syndrome ==
Excessive exposure to hand arm vibrations can result in various patterns of diseases casually known as HAVS or VWF. This can affect nerves, joints, muscles, blood vessels or connective tissues of the hand and forearm:

- Tingling 'whiteness' or numbness in the fingers (blood vessels and nerves affected): This may not be noticeable at the end of a working day, and in mild cases may affect only the tips of the fingers. As the condition becomes more severe, the whole finger down to the knuckles may become white. Feeling may also be lost.
- Fingers change colour (blood vessels affected): With continued exposure the person may experience periodic attacks in which the fingers change colour when exposed to the cold. Initially the fingers rapidly become pale and feeling is lost. This phase is followed by an intense red flush (sometimes preceded by a dusky bluish phase) signalling the return of blood circulation to the fingers and is usually accompanied by uncomfortable throbbing.
- Loss of manual dexterity (nerves and muscles affected): In more severe forms, attacks may occur frequently in cold weather, not only at work, but during leisure activities, such as gardening, car washing or even watching outdoor sports and may last up to an hour causing considerable pain and loss of manual dexterity and reduced grip strength.

In extreme cases, the affected person may lose fingers. The effects are cumulative. When symptoms first appear, they may disappear after a short time. If exposure to vibration continues over months or years, the symptoms can worsen and become permanent.

Exposure to hand arm vibrations is a respectively newer occupational hazard in the work place. While hand arm vibrations have been occurring ever since the first usage of the power tool, concern over damage due to HAVS has lagged behind its fellow hazards such as Noise and chemical hazards. While safety engineers worldwide are collaboratively working on instilling both an Exposure Action Value and an Exposure Limit Value similar to the occupational noise standards, the Occupational Safety and Health Administration, the only regulatory public safety administration in the United States, has yet to offer either official values in the U.S.

== Occupations at risk ==
Occupations at risk of Hand and Arm Vibration Syndrome (HAVs) includes Mining, Foundry, and highest exposure being within construction. One unexpected occupation that is associated with HAVs is dentistry. Dentistry is mainly associated with Musculoskeletal Disorder (MSD). Consequently, HAVs is also linked to this field's ergonomic health issues due to the frequent use of dentistry hand-piece tools. As reported by the Vibration Directive of European Legislation, real-time or one-time use of the dental tools does not surpass the exposure limit. However, a long history of frequent handling of these tools has later been associated with Dental workers experiencing HAVs with inclusion of outside factors, such as high Body Mass Index (BMI). While these workplace industries more prominently affect men in the working population, there are still a significant number of women who also experience HAVs. According to a study conducted in Sweden, about 2% of all women and 14% of all men utilize vibrating tools for work. Women are more likely to experience the symptoms for HAVs at a higher prevalence than men.

== Suggested guidelines ==
While OSHA has yet to supply these values, other countries agencies have. The Health and Safety Executive of the British Government suggests to use an Exposure Action Value of 2.5 m/s^{2} and an Exposure Limit Value of 5.0 m/s^{2}, which is based on the EU directive from 2002. However, it has been shown that those exposure levels still are not safe as 10% of a population would get sensorineural injuries after 5 years at action level exposure. The Canadian Centre for Occupational Health and Safety promotes the ACGIH Threshold Limit Values shown by the adjacent table. When the time-weighted acceleration data exceeds these numbers for the duration, damage from HAVS begins.

There have been additional recommendations based from National Institute for Occupational Safety and Health (NIOSH) to minimize exposure of vibrating tools. Workplaces and Physicians' offices should not only view HAVs as a serious condition but should also look into implementing change. These implementations include engineering control, medical surveillance, and Personal Protective Equipment (PPE) to mitigate vibration exposure. Another implication refers to administrative controls, an example being limiting the amount of hours/days a worker is using the vibrating tools. Furthermore, companies could provide adequate training to workers on the hazards and protocols of handling vibrating tools, along with supplying tools that generate the least amount of vibration while still completing the assignment.

== Damage prevention ==
Good practice in industrial health and safety management requires that worker vibration exposure is assessed in terms of acceleration, amplitude, and duration. Using a tool that vibrates slightly for a long time can be as damaging as using a heavily vibrating tool for a short time. The duration of use of the tool is measured as trigger time, the period when the worker actually has their finger on the trigger to make the tool run, and is typically quoted in hours per day. Vibration amplitude is quoted in metres per second squared, and is measured by an accelerometer on the tool or given by the manufacturer. Amplitudes can vary significantly with tool design, condition and style of use, even for the same type of tool.

Anti vibration gloves are traditionally made with a thick and soft palm material to insulate from the vibrations. The protection is highly dependent on frequency range; most gloves provide no protection in palm and wrist below ~50 Hz and in fingers below ~400 Hz. Factors such as high grip force, cold hands or vibration forces in shear direction can have a reducing effect and or increase damage to the hands and arms. Gloves do help to keep hands warm but to get the desired effect, the frequency output from the tool must match the properties of the vibration glove that is selected.

The effect of legislation in various countries on worker vibration limits has been to oblige equipment providers to develop better-designed, better-maintained tools, and for employers to train workers appropriately. It also drives tool designers to innovate to reduce vibration. Some examples are the easily manipulated mechanical arm (EMMA) and the suspension mechanism designed into chainsaws.

=== UK ===
The Control of Vibration at Work Regulations 2005, created under the Health and Safety at Work etc. Act 1974, is the legislation in the UK that governs exposure to vibration and assists with preventing HAVS occurring.

In the UK, Health and Safety Executive gives the example of a hammer drill which can vary from 6 m/s² to 25 m/s². HSE publishes a list of typically observed vibration levels for various tools, and graphs of how long each day a worker can be exposed to particular vibration levels. This makes managing the risk relatively straightforward. Tools are given an Exposure Action Value (EAV, the time which a tool can be used before action needs to be taken to reduce vibration exposure) and an Exposure Limit Value (ELV, the time after which a tool may not be used).

=== US ===
There are only a few ways to lower the severity and risk of damage from HAVS without complete engineering redesign on the operation of the tools. A few examples could be increasing the dampening through thicker gloves and increasing the trigger size of the tool to decrease the stress concentration of the vibrations on the contact area, but the best course of action would be to buy safer tools that vibrate less. These Exposure Action Values and Exposure Limit Values seem rather low, when compared to lab tested data, shown by the National Institute for Occupational Safety and Health Power Tools Database. Just an example out of the database, the reciprocating saws look to have extremely violent vibrations with one of the saws vibrations reaching 50 m/s^{2} in one hand and over 35 m/s^{2} in the other.

There are various occupational standards of vibration measurement for HAV in use in the United States. They are ANSI S3.34, ACGIH-HAV standard, and NIOSH #89-106. Internationally, European Union Directive 2002/44/EC and ISO5349 are the vibration measurement standards for HAV.

== Health impacts on industrial workers ==
Hand arm vibrations can affect anyone that uses them for a prolonged period of time. There are many types of tools that use hand arm vibrations including chainsaws, engineering controls, and power tools. Many industrial workers use these power tools, for example, when working with construction. Some of the side effects of using hand arm vibrations are discomfort in the head and jaw, chest and abdomen pains, and changing speech. Depending on the way the hand arm vibration instruments are held, it can influence the vibration effects. This includes the grip force that the worker uses on the tool, the density of the material the tool is being used on, and the texture of the material the tool is used on. If the material is harder, the vibrations would shake more vigorously compared to a softer material. Hand arm vibrations can also affect people daily with the pain of using these tools such as disturbing sleep, inability to work in certain conditions, and having a hard time doing daily tasks. Hand arm vibrations can affect the daily lives of workers that use these tools.

== Reactive monitoring ==
While there are different tools used to monitor HAV, a simple system can be used in organizations highlighting excess use of grinding disks when using a hand held angle grinder. This is re-active monitoring and it was introduced by Carl West at a fabrication workshop in Rotherham, England in 2009.

A simpler system, known as re-active monitoring, may be used by, for example, monitoring rates of usage of consumable items. Such a system was introduced by Carl West at a fabrication workshop in Rotherham, England. In this system, the vibration levels of the angle grinding tools in use was measured, as was the average life of a grinding disk. Thus by recording numbers of grinding disks used, vibration exposure may be calculated.

== History ==
The symptoms were first described by Professor Giovanni Loriga in Italy in 1911, although the link was not made between the symptoms and vibrating hand tools until a study undertaken by Alice Hamilton MD in 1918. She formed her theory through following the symptoms reported by quarry cutters and carvers in Bedford, Indiana. She also discovered the link between an increase in HAV symptoms and cold weather as 1918 was a particularly harsh winter.

The first scale for assessing the condition, the Taylor-Pelmear scale, was published in 1975, but it was not listed as a prescribed disease in the United Kingdom until 1985, and the Stockholm scale was introduced in 1987. In 1997, the UK High Court awarded £127,000 in compensation to seven coal miners for vibration white finger. A UK government fund set up to cover subsequent claims by ex-coal miners had exceeded £100 million in payments by 2005.

== See also ==
- List of cutaneous conditions
- Hypothenar hammer syndrome
- Whole-body vibration
