= Chainsaw safety clothing =

Personal protective equipment for operators of chainsaws

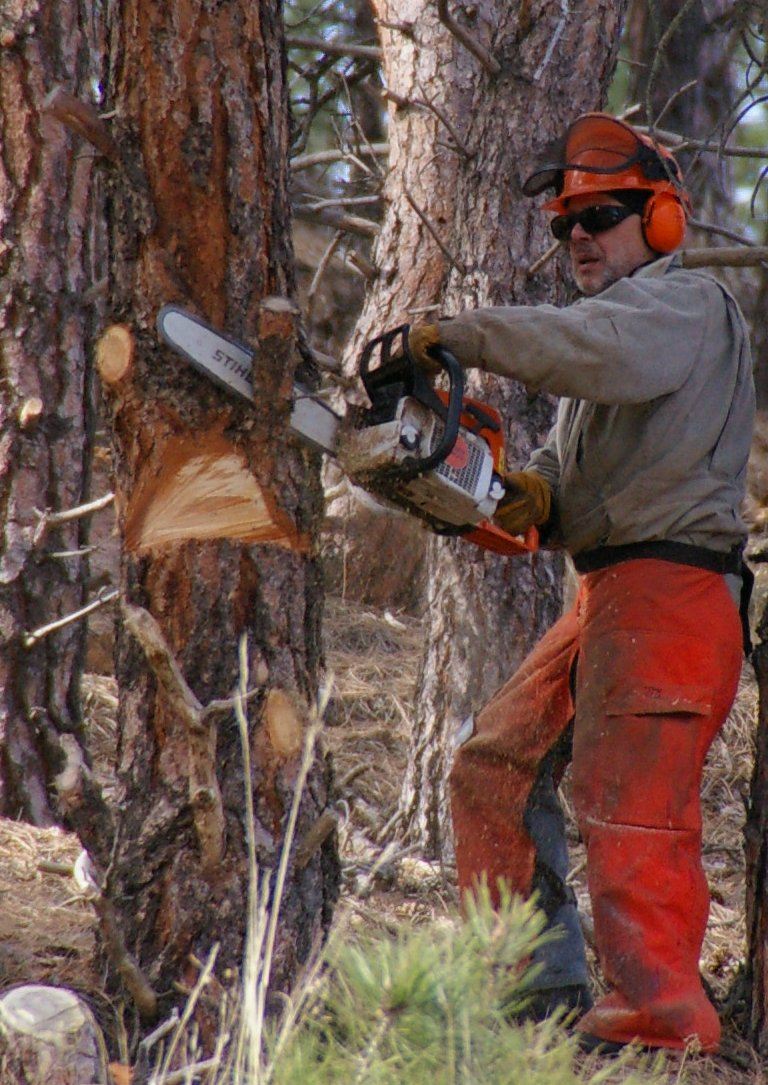
A man cutting while wearing helmet, goggles, ear defenders, gloves, chaps, and boots. Note he is wearing a face shield, but it is currently up and not providing any protection.

Safety practices generally recommend that chainsaw users wear protective clothing, also known as personal protective equipment, while operating chainsaws. There is general agreement worldwide on what clothing is suitable, but local jurisdictions have specific rules and recommendations.

== Clothing ==
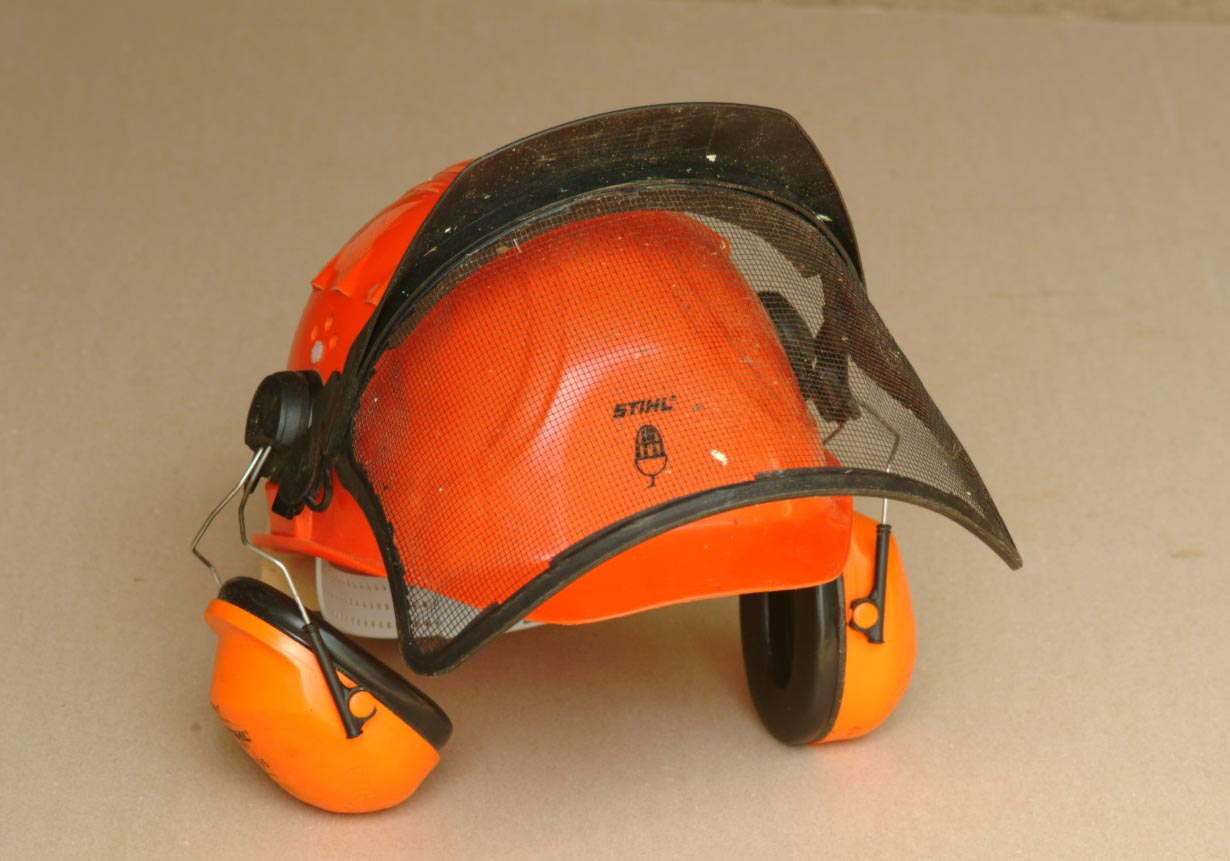
A helmet which integrates visor and ear defenders into one unit, a very popular arrangement with chainsaw users

=== Helmet ===
The helmet offers some protection for the user's head against impact by the cutter bar of the chainsaw, should a 'kickback' occur. Kickback is when the running chainsaw jumps up unexpectedly out of the cut, thus endangering the saw operator. Helmet protection can only be successful if the chain brake has been operated to stop the saw chain, since a chain running at full speed can easily cut into the helmet. The helmet, and its eye protection guard, also protect against impacts from small falling or flying objects, such as dead twigs and branches from a tree being felled.

Exposure to the sun causes the plastic of the helmet to weaken over time, so it is recommended that a helmet be replaced every 3–5 years. A helmet normally has a symbol inside that indicates when it was made. Many helmets also now have a sticker on the outside that fades with exposure to light. When the sticker has faded, the helmet should be replaced. Another way of determining if a helmet needs to be changed is to press the two sides of the helmet towards each other. If a cracking noise is heard, the helmet must be replaced.

In the EU, a helmet must meet the requirements of EN397. Helmets, as well as other safety equipment in Germany must have the KWF sign.

In Canada, the selection, care, and use of industrial protective headwear must comply with CSA Standard Z94.1-15: Industrial Protective Headwear – Performance, Selection, Care, and Use or the applicable legislation in each province and territory.

=== Visor or goggles ===
A visor or goggles reduce the chance of chips penetrating the user's eyes.

The relatively flimsy mesh visor, with imperfect coverage of the face, is considered acceptable, because the chips produced by well-maintained chainsaws are of relatively uniform size and speed. Unlike other woodworking tools, a chainsaw with a sharp chain produces little or no sawdust, only chips (which are too large to fit through the visor's mesh).

Some chainsaw users prefer conventional safety glasses or goggles. The choice may depend on the environment. The visor provides ventilation for hard work in hot weather, but safety goggles can prevent smaller pieces of debris from getting into the user's eye. Often, both safety goggles and a visor are employed for superior protection.

In the EU, a visor must comply with EN1731, or glasses must comply with EN166.

=== Chainsaw safety mitt ===
A leather mitt is for the operator's left hand that is fitted to, but is free to rotate on, the front bar of the chainsaw.

The safety mitt ensures that if kickback occurs, the operator's hand remains on the bar of the chainsaw. This means that the kickback is more easily controlled, and the chain brake is more easily engaged. The safety mitt also protects the operator's left hand in the same way as chainsaw safety gloves. The protection on the left hand mitt protects when the chain derails and jumps over the front handle.

Most safety mitts have a protection class 0 (up to 16m/s chain speed, see below), but there are mitts available covering class 1 (20m/s chain speed).

=== Ear defenders ===
Ear defenders and ear plugs attenuate noise to levels that cause little or no damage to the user's hearing. Non-electric chainsaws are very loud, typically 115 dB, which is above the recommended exposure limit of 85dB from the National Institute for Occupational Safety and Health.

In the EU, ear defenders must comply with EN352-1.

=== Trousers (pants) ===
Special fabrics have been developed for chainsaw clothing, and this development is still ongoing. Conventional fabric is useless as protection against a running chainsaw, as the fabric can be cut through immediately.

There have been difficulties developing a fabric that can withstand more violent impact while still being light, flexible and comfortable enough for the user. Clothes which make the user too hot, or which prevent the user moving easily, are a safety problem in themselves. A worker who is unable to move easily or suffering from being too hot is not safe. Extra fabric layers are added to clothing to improve cut resistance, but clothes which cannot be cut at all by a powerful saw are impractical, even with modern fibres. Additionally, saw and chain technology seems to be outstripping fabric technology because it is very difficult to protect against high power saws employing aggressively cutting chains.

A classification scheme has been developed in the EU to rate trousers, and fabric in general, for protection against cutting.

Chainsaw Fabric Classification
Class	Max chain speed
0	16 m/s
1	20 m/s
2	24 m/s
3	28 m/s

The chain speed is specified in the manual for a chainsaw. Higher class trousers are more expensive, hotter, and heavier, so there is an advantage to choosing the trousers to match the saw.

There are two standard types of trousers, type A and type C. Type A protects only the front of the legs, and can be supplied as chaps, worn over conventional work clothes, or as conventional trousers. Type C gives protection all around the legs and are almost always worn as ordinary trousers, not over another garment. Chaps are generally used for occasional, farm or homeowner applications. Professional chainsaw operators would choose trousers for comfort and ease of movement, with fallers, ground workers and firewood cutters opting for class A trousers, because of the low risk of being cut in the back of the leg. Climbers and tree surgeons would have to wear type C, as they will be cutting from a wider variety of positions. Type C trousers are, of course, highly insulating, and may lead to heat stress if worn for labour-intensive operations such as firewood cutting. Chainsaw protective fabric works on a number of principles. The outermost layer can be made both tough and slippery, to protect against minor damage which could compromise the filler material. Beneath these, long, loose fibres of polyester, Avertic, ballistic nylon, or Kevlar is laid in layers. When a saw contacts the trousers, the outer layer is immediately cut through, but the inner is drawn out and wraps around the saw's drive sprocket, locking it solid and halting the chain, limiting damage to the operator's leg. The length of the fabrics and number of layers match the safety class. In case of an accident, the fabric is pulled out of the upper and lower seam and wraps around the sprocket as described above. Trousers should be slightly baggy, so that there is give, to prevent the chain pulling the operator's leg into the chainsaw. Instead, the 'baggy' excess fabric is pulled out and into the chain mechanism, thereby stopping the saw. After stopping a saw, the damaged trousers must be scrapped, having done their job. The saw must be field-stripped to remove the fibres, and to allow it to run again.

If some trousers are washed, the material inside may degrade over time. As a result, these trousers should be replaced, and not washed in hot water too frequently. If the trousers have Avertic as protection, they should be washed regularly to maintain its protective features. Likewise, trousers should be free of rips and tears that may catch on a chain saw or timber when moving through a forest.

In case the trousers are damaged, it is permissible to repair them, only as long the inside protective fabric layers are not damaged. If they are damaged, the trousers are no longer safe and they must be discarded, and a new pair obtained.

Chainsaw protective trousers in the EU must comply with EN ISO 11393-2:2018.

=== Jacket ===
For detailed information on fabric ratings, see the section above on trousers. The logic is much the same - the protective materials are designed to slow the chain's rate of cutting and clog the mechanism, rather than protect the wearer completely.

Chainsaw protective jackets in the EU must comply with EN381-11.

=== Gloves ===
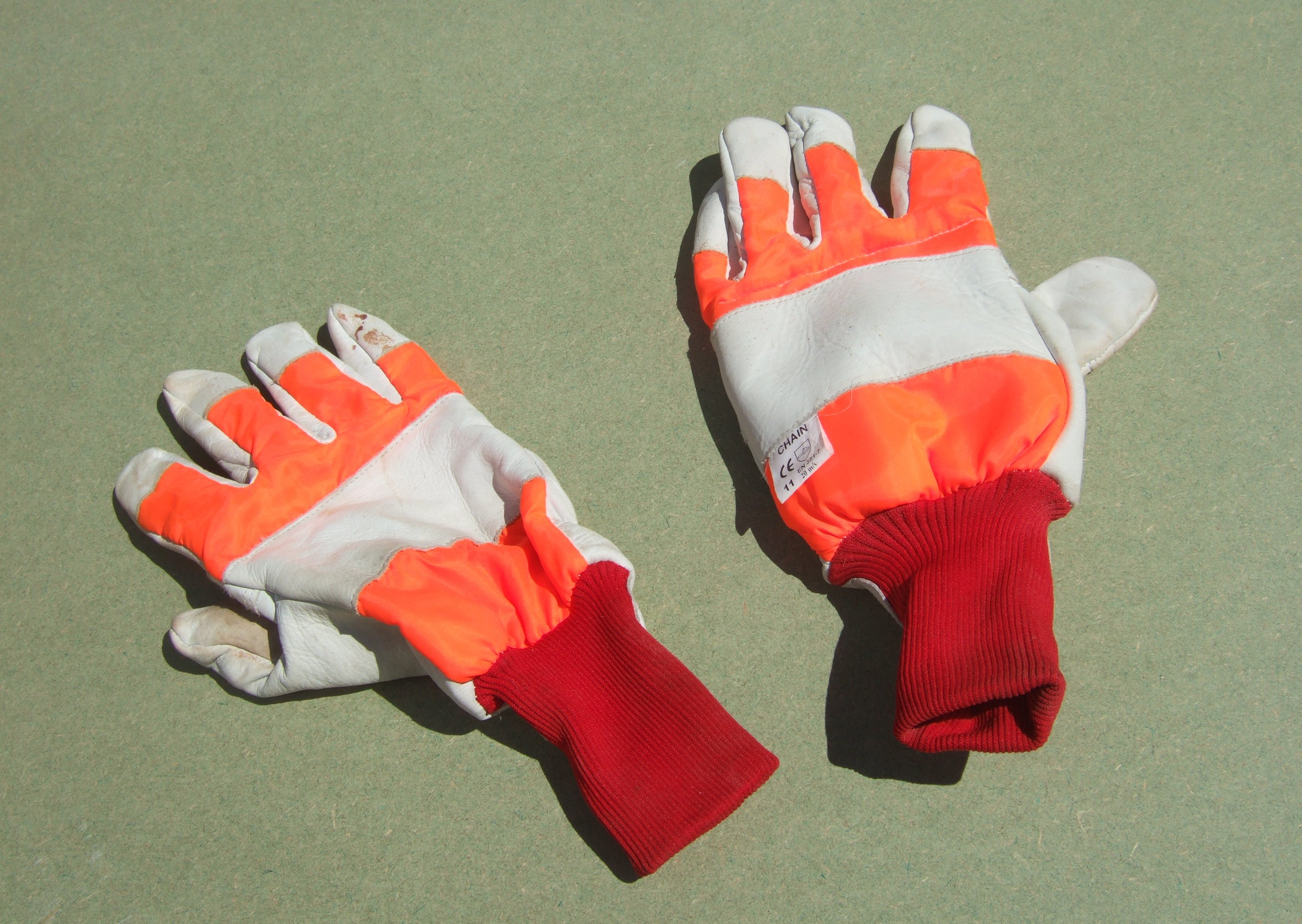
Chainsaw gloves. Only the back of the left hand glove contains chainsaw protective fabric, and so only that glove carries the chainsaw label.

Chainsaw gloves have cut-proof fabric protection like that for trousers, but only on the back of the left hand. It is especially important that work gloves are flexible, which limits how much padding they can have. Experience has shown that most chainsaw injuries to the hands occur on the back of the left hand.

In the EU, chainsaw gloves must comply with EN381-7.

=== Boots ===
Chainsaw boots are based on ordinary steel-toe boots, but have layers of chainsaw protective fabric on the exposed front surfaces. They are available in lace-up leather or rubber Wellington boot versions. Popular manufacturers of chainsaw boots sold in Europe include Haix, Klima-Air, Rock Fall, Meindl, and Oregon.

Boots protect the operator from cuts to the front and sides of the foot.

In the EU, chainsaw boots must comply with EN345-2. These boots must be to the appropriate EN20345 standard for general safety footwear, and must also be distinctively marked as suitable for chainsaw use, according to EN381-3

Protective chainsaw gaiters to EN381-9 over general steel-toe boots are acceptable for occasional users.

== History ==
The first generation of protective fabrics consisted of a multi-layered and specially designed tricot fabric that peeled off layer by layer at contact with the cutting chains. Statistics showed a reduction in injuries at work-related accidents in forestry and logging. However, the new fabrics did not stop the more severe accidents with deep cuts and lethal outcomes.

In the mid-1980s, Kjell Eng introduced the second generation of chainsaw protection, and Engtex was granted its first patent in 1989.

Development of third generation protective fabrics started in 1992, under the name Avertic. By using a new combination of settings, materials and finishing, this new generation of protective textiles enhanced not only the washability of garments, but also the level of protection compared to earlier generations. Avertic chainsaw protective textiles are still used in chaps, trousers, boots, jackets and gloves around the world. The manufacturers of personal protective equipment strive daily to invent better protection for workers in the forestry and logging industry.

== Chainsaw logo ==
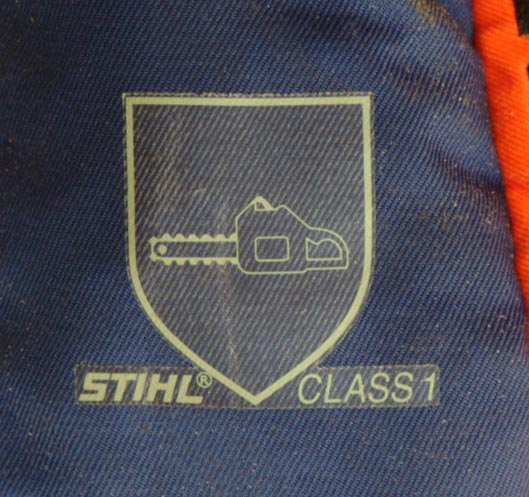
Logo for fabric

In the EU, chainsaw trousers, boots, and gloves (the items containing chainsaw protective fabric) must carry a special chainsaw logo. This shows that the fabric has been tested to protect properly, and also shows the class of protection.

== Additional personal protective equipment ==
=== First aid kit ===
In the UK and Germany, workers are required to carry a first aid kit containing at least a large wound dressing.

=== Whistle and cell phone ===
In the UK, workers are recommended to carry a whistle to call for help if they are injured. Colleagues may be close by, but unable to hear shouts for help over the noise of a running chainsaw.

In Germany, a "Hilfe im Wald" ("Help in the forest") app shows the next security point where ambulances have access. These safety points are numbered and visible by a pole with an orange head with the point number on it. These numbers are known to ambulances.

== See also ==
- Chainsaw safety features
- Protective clothing
