= Stihl (disambiguation) =

Stihl is a manufacturer of handheld power tools.

The term may also refer to:

- Andreas Stihl, the founder of the company
- Stihl Timbersports Series, a lumberjack competition series made by the company
