= Zama Group =

German manufacturer of carburetors

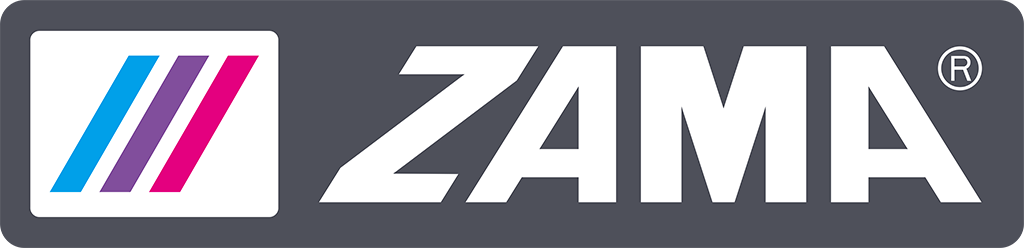
- Zama Group logo
- Formerly: Shinagawa Die-Casting Co. Ltd.
- Industry: manufacturing
- Founded: September 1, 1952
- Founder: Kato Jiro
- Headquarters: Hong Kong, China
- Number of locations: Japan, United States, China, Philippines (2019)
- Area served: worldwide
- Key people: Jan-Grigor Schubert (Group President), William Yang (VP Production / President Legal Entity China), Thorsten König (VP Commercial), Randy Sherman (VP Sales), Mamoru Toda (VP development), Ronald Wienholts (VP Operations / President & Managing Director Legal Entity Philippines)
- Products: electronic fuel injection (EFI) systems, carburetors, oil pumps, solenoid valves, chain tensioning systems, output shafts, solutions for fuel management, customer specific machined parts
- Production output: 12 million carburetors, 4 million oil-pumps (2019)
- Owner: Stihl International GmbH
- Number of employees: 2414 (2019)
- Website: http://www.zamacorp.com/

Zama Group is a family-held German-owned company and a manufacturer of diaphragm carburetors, oil pumps and further mechanical precision engine components. Their headquarters are in Hong Kong, China. Zama supplies mainly to original equipment manufacturers (OEMs) of gasoline-powered outdoor tools, such as Stihl, Husqvarna or Yamabiko. It claims itself to be the technology leader in their industry.

== History ==
Zama was founded on 1 September 1952 as Shinagawa Die-Casting Co. Ltd. in Shinagawa City Tokyo, Japan by Kato Jiro. With 20 employees, Zama primarily focused on producing Automobile parts for Japanese companies. In 1962 the company was moved to Zama City, Kanagawa Prefecture near Yokohama, Japan which had an influence on the later name of the company: Zama. In July 1975, the number of employees had reached approximately 200, and Zama entered into the carburetor business, which is their core business area today.

=== Expansion ===
In September 1981, the first location abroad was established in Torrance, California, United States as USA Zama Inc. to support the Headquarters in Japan by marketing, importing and delivering Zama carburetors to American customers. After four years another factory was opened in Iwate, Japan which specialized in diaphragm carburetor assembly as well as die designing and tooling. In March 1989, Zama Industries was founded in Hong Kong to reduce the negative impact on revenue caused by a sudden change of the currency exchange rate of JPY and USD. Another facility was opened in November 1990 in Franklin, Tennessee, USA to expand the US operations in engineering and to establish a Zama aftermarket department. In August 1991, a second factory with 400 employees was opened in Iwate, Japan to meet the demands for more capacity. The factory was opened for die-casting and machining for automobile parts. By the end of 1991, a factory with 450 employees was opened in the Special Economic Zone of XiLi, Shenzhen, China and major parts of the Hong Kong facilities were moved there. The main focus of this facility is the production of diaphragm carburetors. Due to the strong growth, the factory was extended in 1997 and in 2000. In 2006, when direct labor headcount had surpassed 1,000 employees, all production facilities were consolidated in one factory site in Shenzhen and a die-casting and storage facility in Hong Kong. Due to rising risk of only one main production site, Zama decided to open a second main production facility in Santo Tomas, Batangas, Philippines which was inaugurated in January 2016. In 2018 the XiLi factories were relocated to a new factory in Huizhou, China due to municipal plans to remodel the former industrial area of XiLi into a commercial/residential zone.

=== Development of product variety ===
Starting out with the production and distribution of die-casting products, Zama developed into the world’s largest manufacturer of diaphragm carburetors and sells further products nowadays. Zama's first carburetor was produced in 1975, and the production of oil pumps was initiated in 2003. Further milestones for Zama were the production of their first electronic carburetor in 2009 and the production of their first solenoid valve in 2016.

== Group structure ==
=== Stihl Holding ===
The Zama group is part of the Stihl Holding AG & Co. KG which is headquartered in Waiblingen, Germany. The Zama factories are subsidiaries owned 100% by the Stihl International GmbH.

=== Locations of Zama group and tasks ===
Zama operates in five locations around the world. Zama Corporation in Hong Kong is the administrative, financial and logistic center of the Zama Group, and distributes more than 14 million carburetors worldwide, making use of the excellent logistic and financial facilities in Hong Kong. Zama Precision Industries (Huizhou) Corporation Ltd. in Guangdong, China serves as the production location of Zama Group. Approximately 1,600 associates produce electronic fuel injection systems, carburetors, oil pumps, solenoid-valves and other parts for the outdoor industry. Zama Japan is the center of Research and Development, design of in-house production tooling, as well as support for Japanese domestic customers. Zama Philippines, the newest Zama plant, is producing carburetors and miniaturized coils for solenoid valves. USA Zama, Inc, located in Franklin, Tennessee serves as the Sales headquarters for the Zama Group and the world headquarters for Zama Aftermarket Sales.

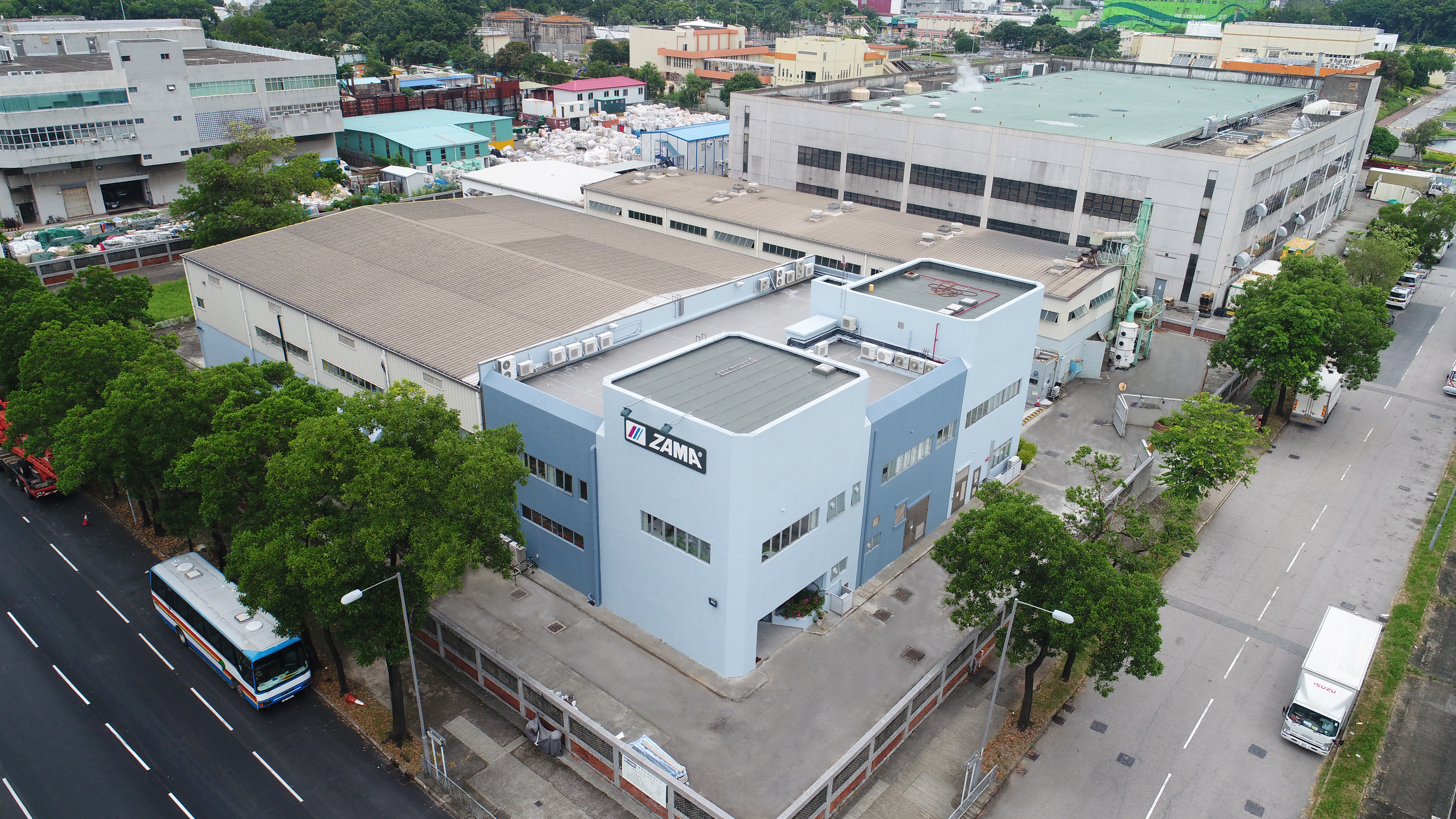
Zama Hong Kong

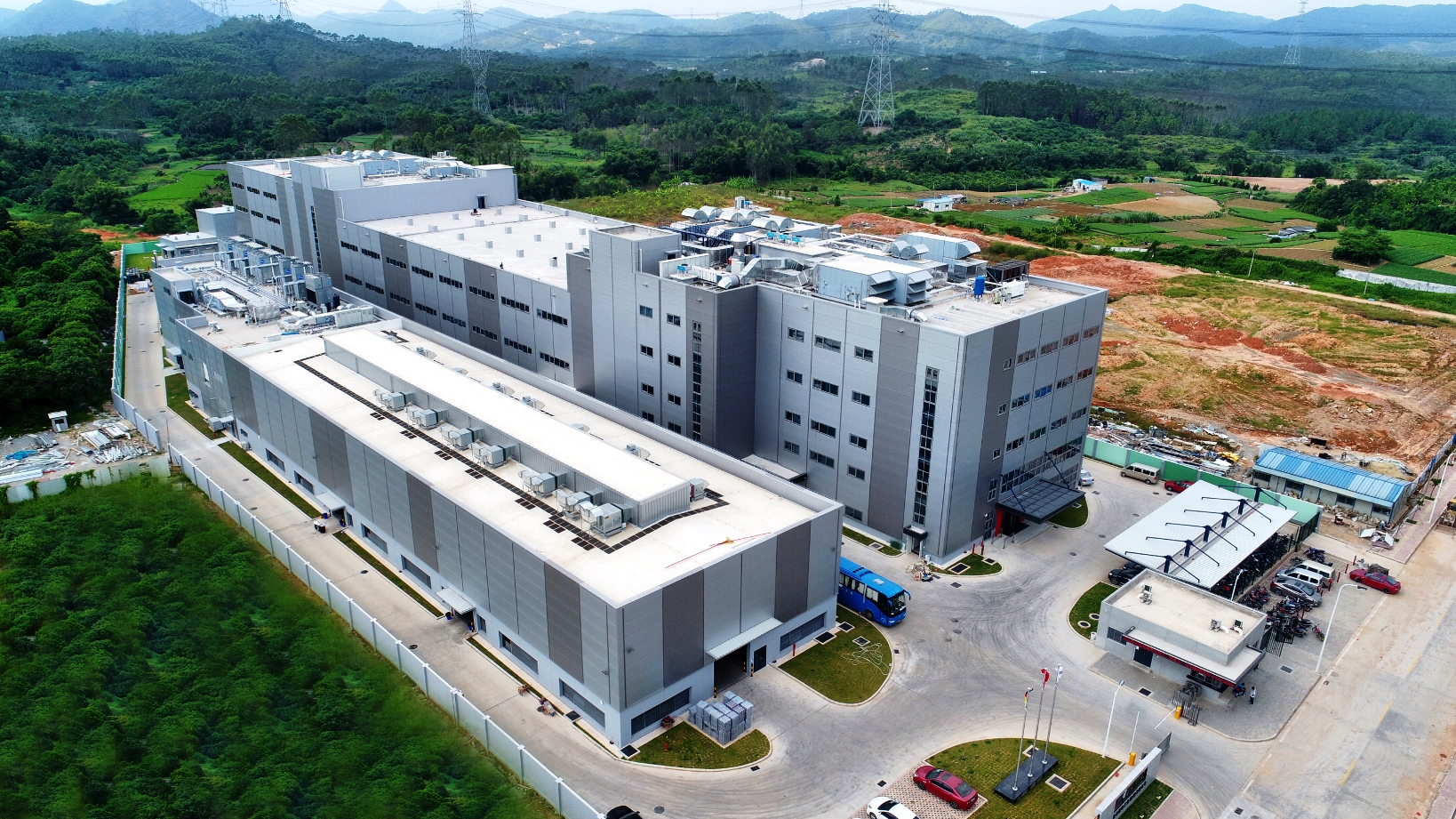
Zama China

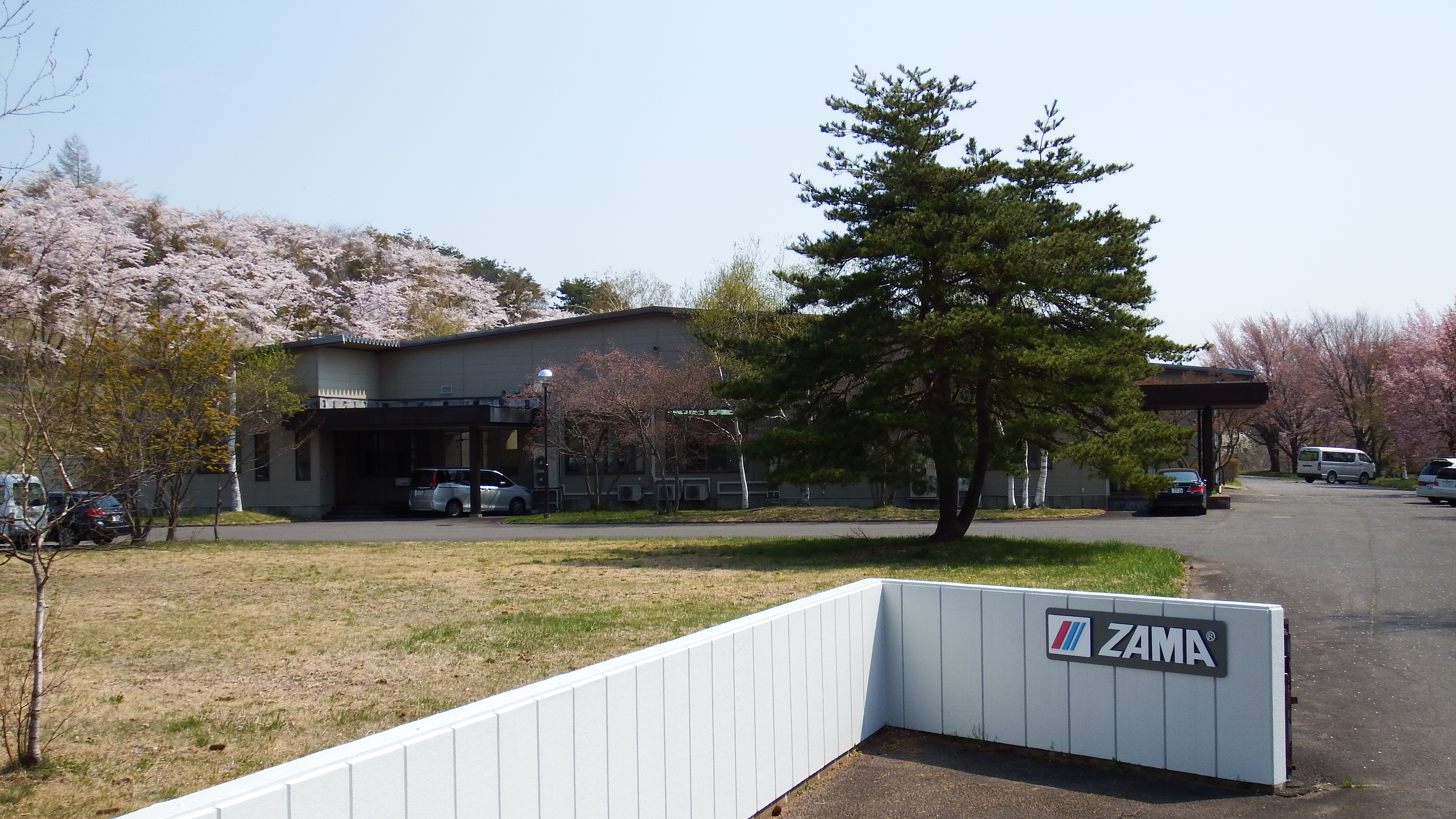
Zama Japan

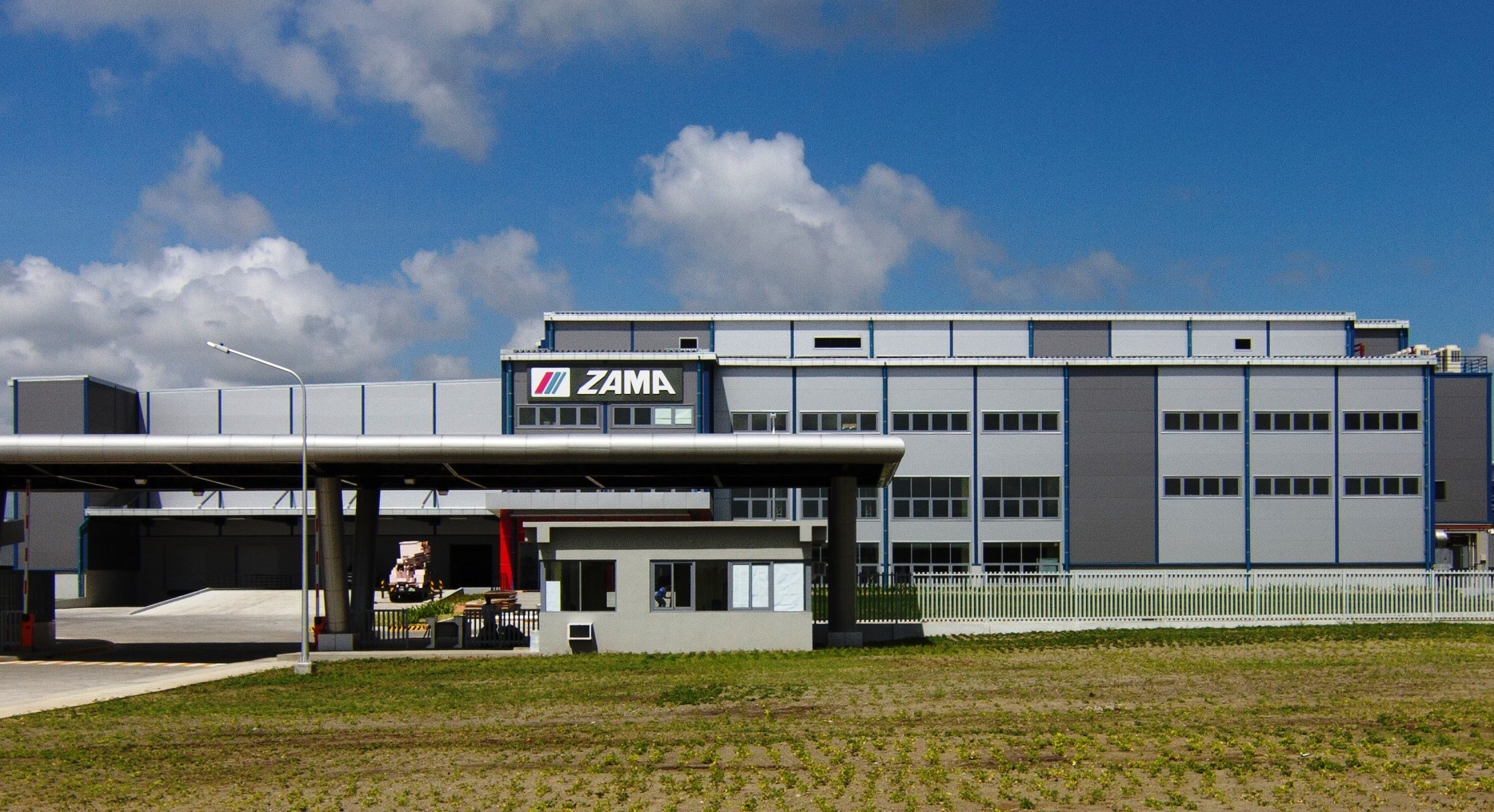
Zama Philippines

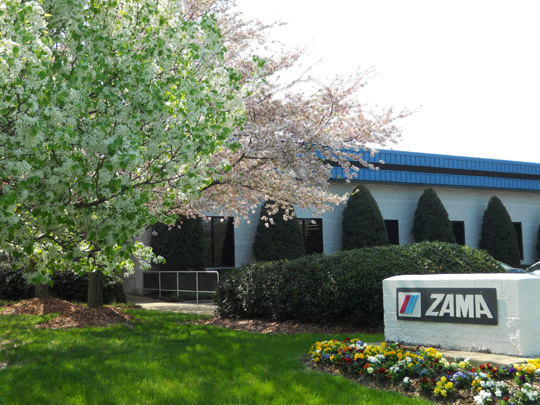
Zama USA

Locations of the Zama Group

== Products and customers ==
Zama offers about 350 different models of diaphragm carburetors and is a major manufacturer of lubricating systems for chainsaws. Other products Zama sells include electronic fuel injection systems, solenoid valves, output shafts, and complete solutions for fuel management as well as other customer-specific parts. Together with their partners, they offer complete engine management systems for small 2 and 4 cycle engines. OEM customers, such as Stihl, Husqvarna or Yamabiko, are mainly producers of lawn and garden products.
