= Chainsaw mill =

Type of sawmill incorporating a chainsaw

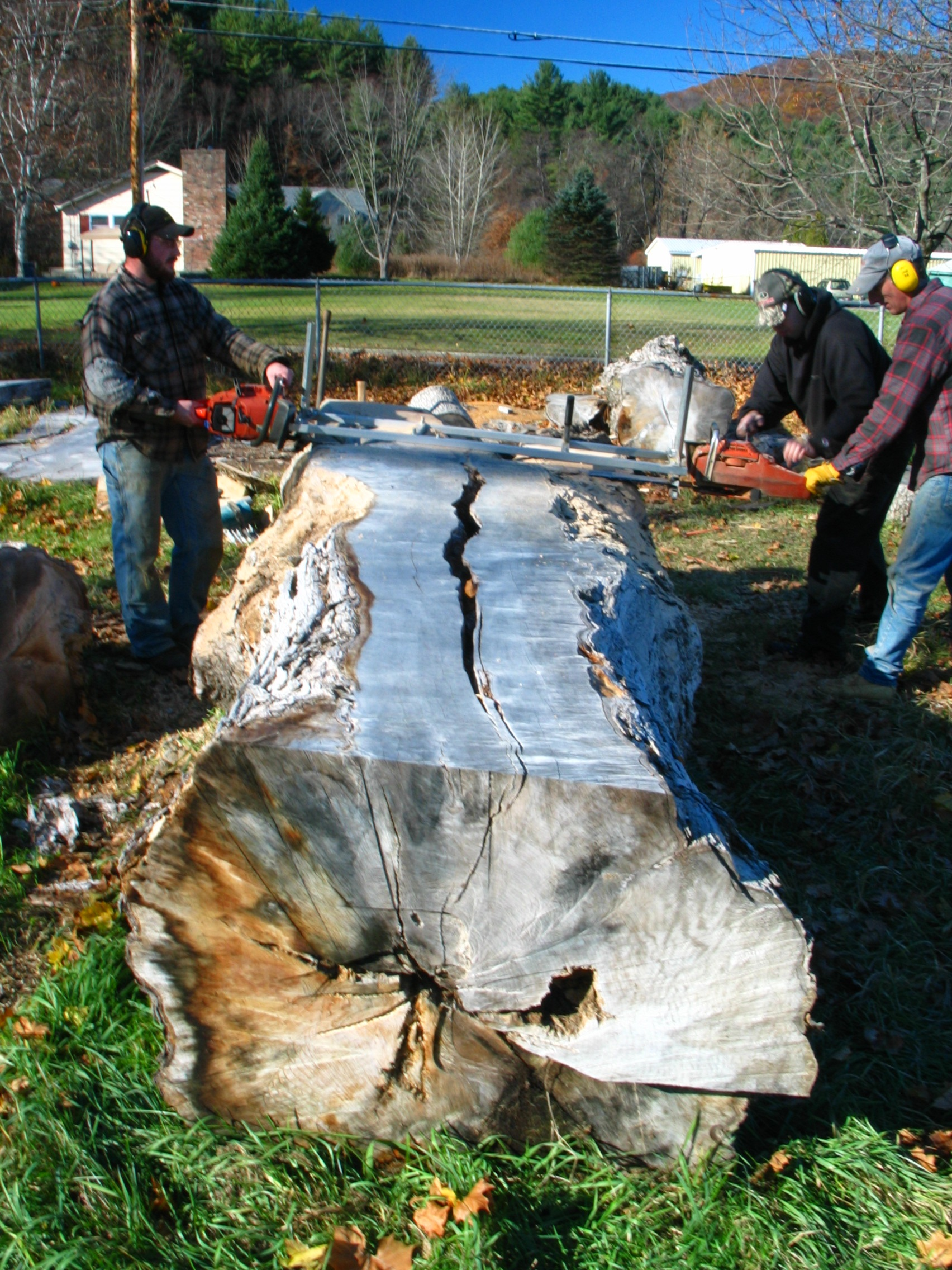
A chainsaw mill in use

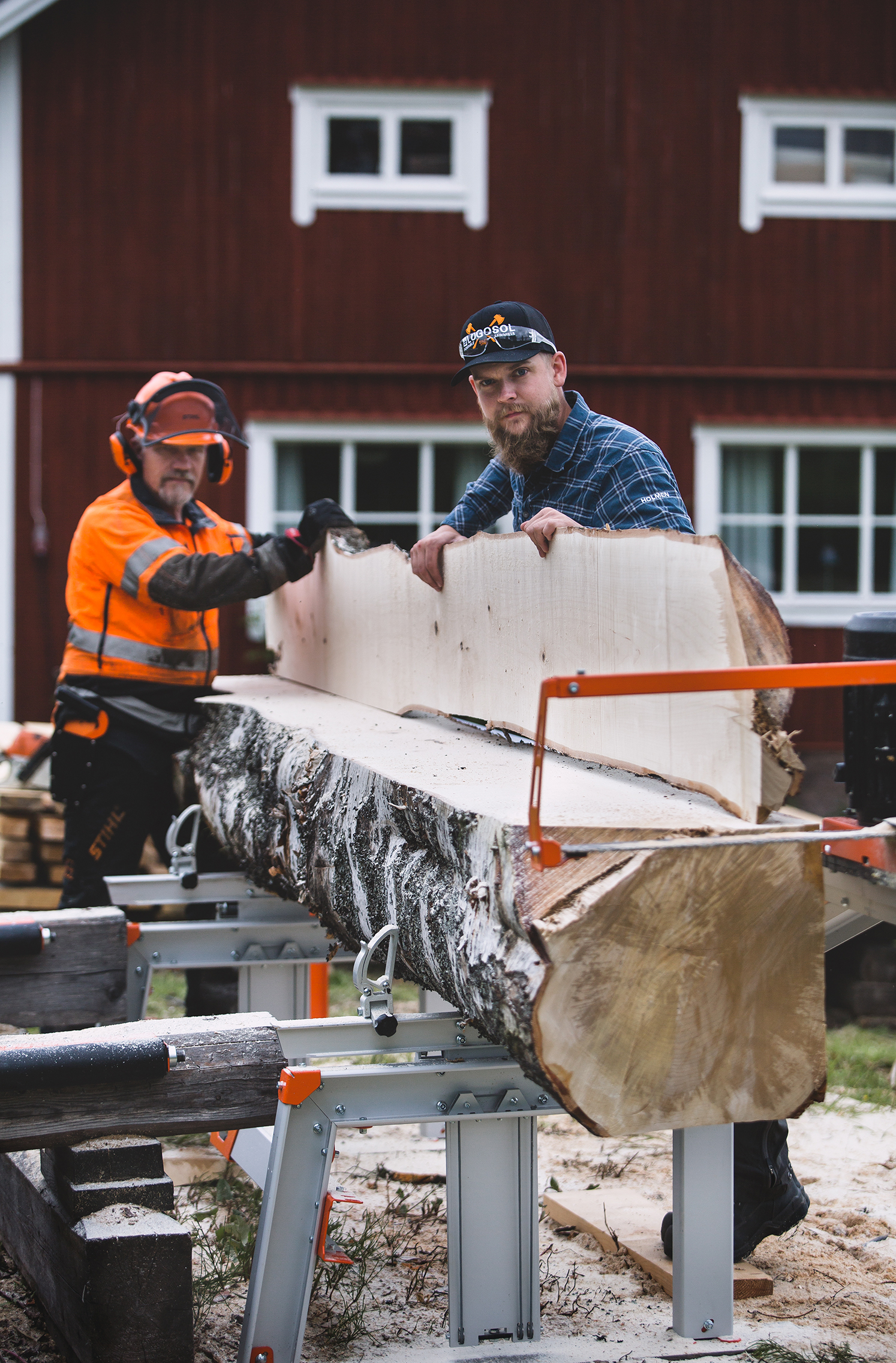
Milling Birch on a Logsol F2 plus chainsaw mill

A chainsaw mill or PortaMill or Logosol sawmill is a type of sawmill incorporating a chainsaw, that is used by one or two operators to mill logs into lumber for use in furniture, construction and other uses. Although often used as a generic term, Alaskan Mill is a registered trademark of Granberg International.

== Description ==
The mill attachment consists of a pair of clamping brackets connected to a rectangular frame which is attached to the bar of the chainsaw. The rails ride for the first cut on a guide system, plank or on a metal ladder which is screwed to the log (but not so tightly that the guide is pulled out of plane), and then on the previously cut surface of the log, and guide the chainsaw blade through the log at a consistent depth so that planks of a chosen thickness are cut. The distance between the rails and the bar determines this thickness and it can be adjusted by moving the rails along the depth posts at each end of the mill attachment. During use it is important that the rails extend out past the ends of the log so the cut has support the entire time.

Smaller mills use a single chainsaw and can be handled by a single operator. Larger mills use a double ended bar, powered by either a single large chainsaw (typically ~120cc) and a helper handle or stinger, or two chainsaw power heads, one on either side of the mill apparatus. These typically require two operators if the bar is over 48 inches. This larger style of mill needs a special bar which allows the two chainsaw heads to be attached at either end. The length of the bar decides the maximum width of the plank that can be cut, up to 34 inches (86 cm), so for logs with a large diameter, the longer bar is necessary. Also, to waste less wood due to the kerf width, a special chain is designed to make rip cuts rather than the usual chainsaw chain which is for cross-cutting.

For the first cut, a pair of rails or a plank are usually attached to the log to give the mill attachment a reference surface to guide it, or other commercially made jigs are available such as a timberjigs. Subsequent cuts are made using the surface of the previous cut as the guide.

The kerf of a chainsaw cut is wide, relative to the kerf of a bandsaw mill or circular saw. This is no problem when cutting a single beam or large timber from a log, and would only represent significant waste if used to saw many thin boards. Most chainsaw chains produce a kerf that is approximately 1/4", so one inch of wood is lost for every four cuts with a chainsaw mill.

Chainsaw mills are relatively cheap to purchase compared to other types of portable sawmill and are the most portable type of powered sawmill. They are therefore popular with hobbyist woodworkers who have access to felled timber.

Logosol is a Swedish based international company, they started making chainsaw mills in 1989. They currently offer several models of chainsaw mills. F2 sawmill, F2+ sawmill, Timberjig and Big Mill Wide Slabber.

== See also ==
- Pit saw
- Hewing
- Wood splitting
- Wood drying
