= Portable sawmill =

Movable sawmill for use in the field

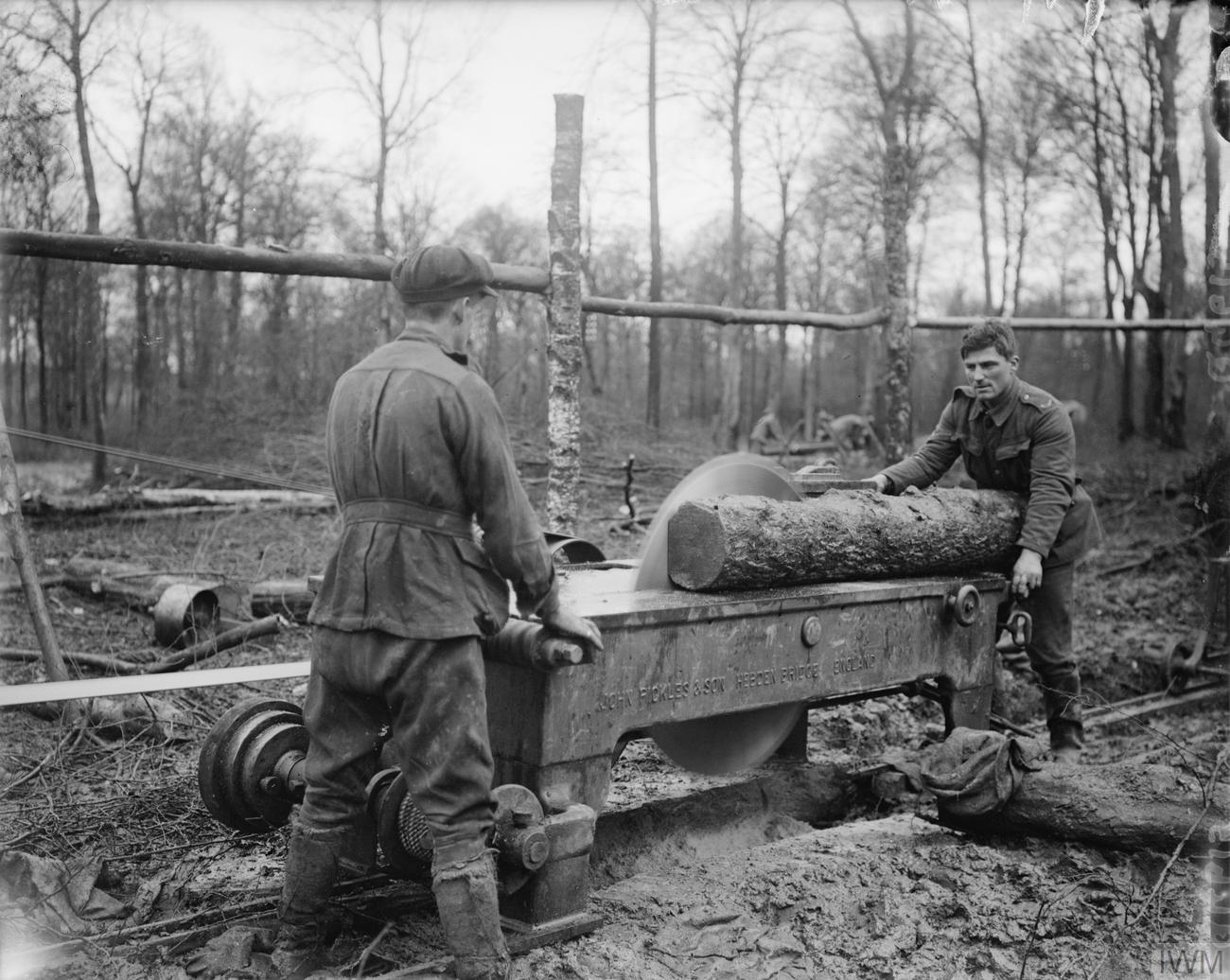
A portable sawmill during World War I

Portable sawmills are sawmills small enough to be moved easily and set up in the field. They have existed for over 100 years but grew in popularity in the United States starting in the 1970s, when the 1973 oil crisis and the back-to-the-land movement had led to renewed interest in small woodlots and in self-sufficiency. Their popularity has grown exponentially since 1982, when the portable bandsaw mill was first commercialized.

== History ==
Video of a portable sawmill being powered by a traction engine

Arguably, as once used in early Canadian forest logging, the donkey engine was one of the earliest portable sawmills. It was used to winch and haul log booms across lakes and water, then winch itself across land or water to its next site, and finally it would be reconfigured to run a saw to mill the timber.

The first dedicated portable sawmills were typified by the "One Man Farmer's Sawmills" that featured large circular blades and were marketed during the early twentieth century by companies like Sears, Montgomery Ward and JC Penney. These mail-order examples were "private label" machines manufactured by the Belsaw Company. Another company that built such mills was the American Sawmill Machinery Company. Many early sawmills were designed to be belt-driven from a steam traction engine (which could also be used to transport the saw).

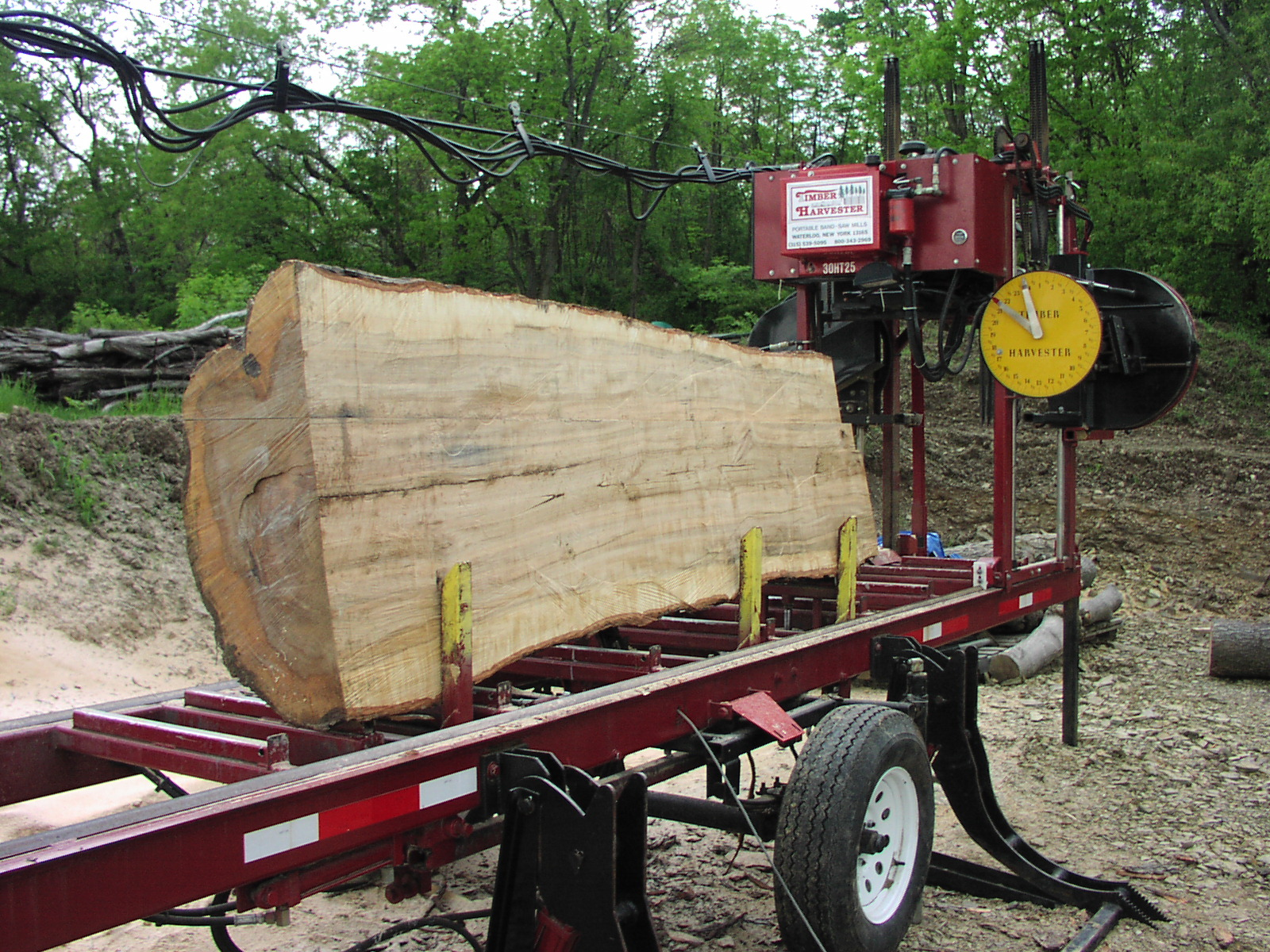
Bandsaw-type portable sawmill

With the invention of the Wood-Mizer in 1982, portable bandsaw mills represented a dramatic shift in design. Unlike traditional mills, they used a thin-kerf blade of the type used on a band saw rather than a circular blade, which reduced weight and cost, and reduced the size and weight of the bearings and support blocks. The smaller kerf on these blades dramatically increased the yield from a given log. Use of band blades also allowed for a different design where the head, consisting of the blade and a power source, moves back and forth while the log remains stationary. This is in contrast to traditional mills where the log moves on a trolley while the blade remains fixed. Many companies now manufacture and sell personal and portable sawmills, including companies like Norwood Industries, Hud Son, TimberKing and Woodland Mills.

Larger mills have recently come on the market which are portable only in sections. These cut faster and can handle larger logs but do require additional set up.

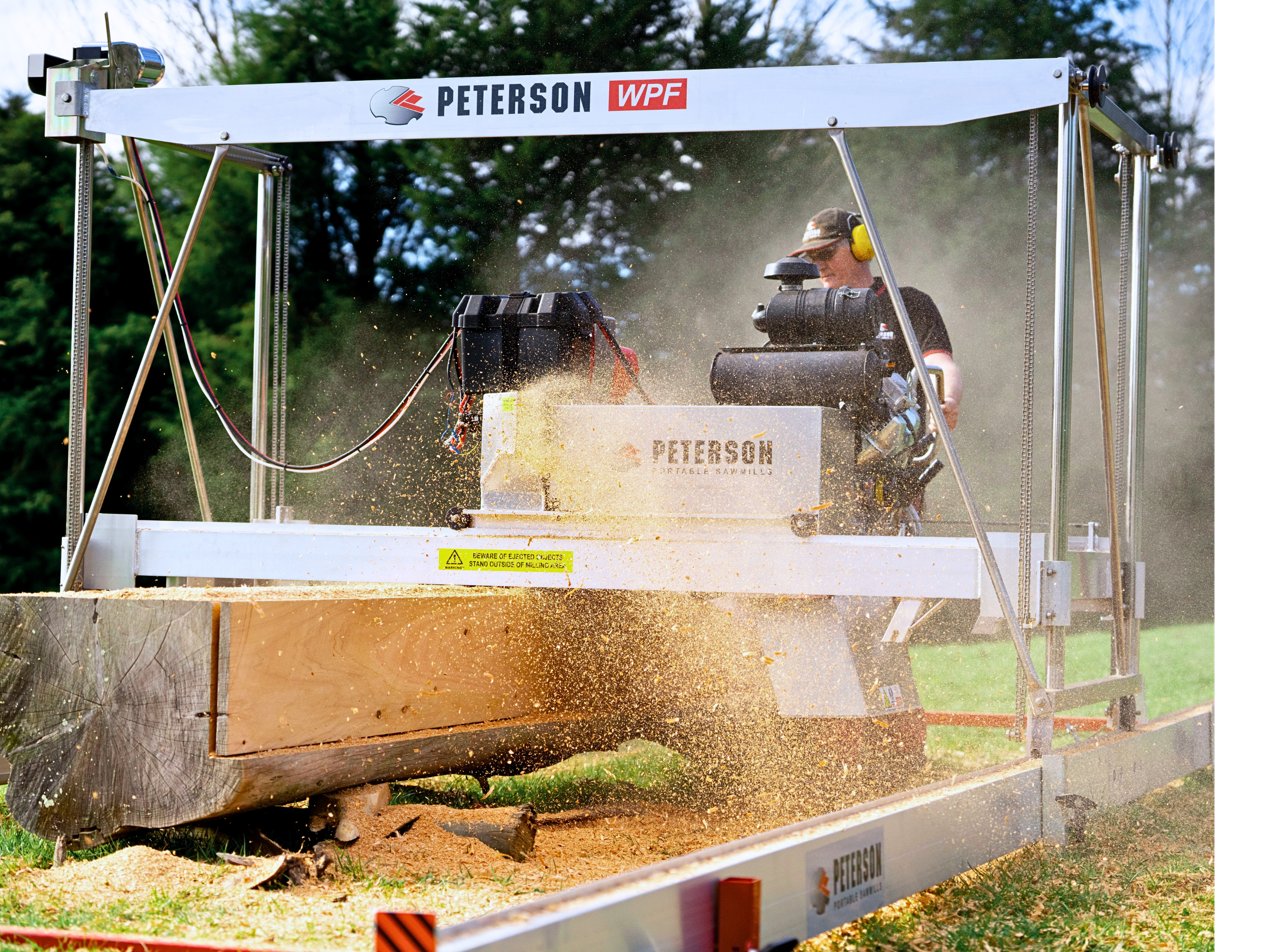
Peterson Winch Production Frame cutting 12 1/2" vertical board

In 1989 a new type of technology came on the market, in the form of the portable Swingblade Sawmill which was designed by Peterson Sawmills in New Zealand. This type of portable sawmill utilised a much smaller, thin-kerf, single circular sawblade that pivoted 90 degrees to cut one fully-edged board in a return pass. The log no longer required turning or mounting on a trailer, and boards were fully edged, providing a substantial advantage to truly portable sawmilling. A swingblade sawmill works with the sawing head moving over a stationary log, with fully edged boards being removed. Swingblade portable sawmill blade maintenance costs are around 1/10th that of a bandsaw portable sawmill

These types of portable sawmills have found favour in remote locations and third world countries, along with farmers, builders, and log cabin builders due to their versatility. Swingblade portable sawmills have also evolved to commercial automated versions that can remain in a fixed site where logs are brought in to the mill.

== Advantages ==
Portable mills can be trailered and set up on site, next to the trees being cut. Some businesses transport their mill to harvest urban timber where moving the logs would be impractical.

== Disadvantages ==
Purchasing bandsaw blades and having them sharpened is more expensive than circular saw blades such as those used on a swingblade sawmill.

Most trailered mills position the log on top of the trailer; some models have hydraulic log loading arms and some do not. Raising heavy logs without hydraulics can be a problem. There are portable mills with rails on the ground allowing a log to be positioned easily without hydraulics.

== Uses ==
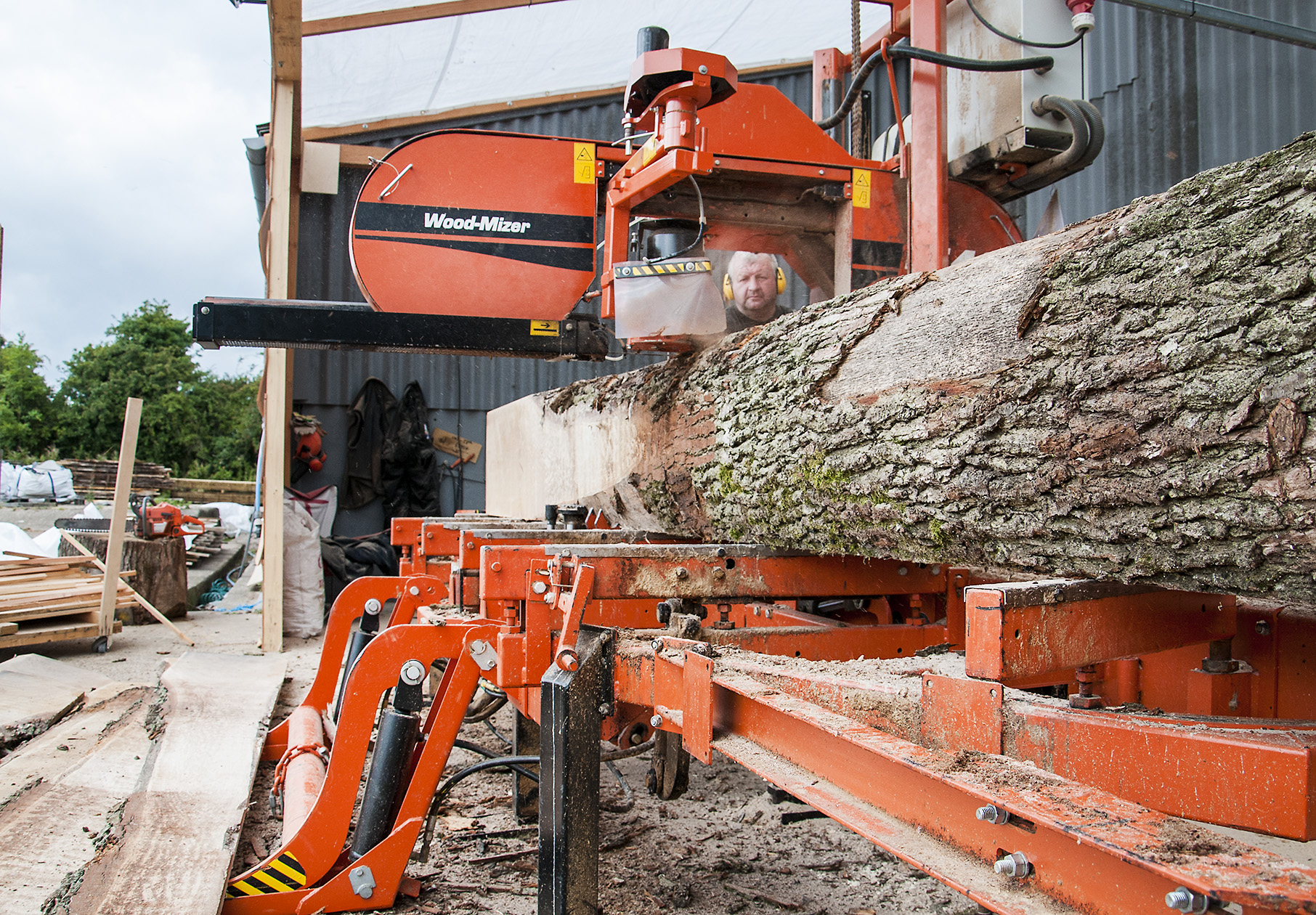
A portable sawmill enables small to medium-sized lumber producers the flexibility of cutting their own logs to their needs.

The portable mills can cut lumber with speed and accuracy, though the subsequent steps of planing and drying must still be performed to produce finished lumber. Commodity lumber in standard sizes can be made this way.

The more common use, however, is in the production of specialty timber products not readily available through lumber yards. The most common ways they are used to generate an income are - sawing lumber for customers as a mobile service, cutting and selling lumber locally, and cutting lumber that is directly used to create a final product. Portable mills are particularly effective for truing up logs for use in log building, replacing the traditional use of a drawknife, which is inordinately time-consuming. They are also used for low-volume production of specialty hardwoods used in furniture, and can be used to produce the large timbers used in post-and-beam framing techniques.

Portable sawmill owners often use their mills to build their own projects, finding that the money saved by producing their own lumber for their projects justifies the expense of the mill.

Portable mills have also been used in conjunction with salvage logging operations. In salvage logging, logs that were lost underwater during nineteenth-century river-borne log drives are recovered by divers. These logs are often worth many thousands of dollars. The thin kerf blade of the portable sawmill allows for much higher board foot yields from these valuable logs.

== Types ==
- Bandsaw mill
- Chainsaw mill
- Swingblade sawmill

== Related machinery ==
Timberjigs allow a chainsaw equipped with a ripping chain to be used like a sawmill.
