= Stihl =

German power tool manufacturer

Andreas Stihl AG & Co.
- Logo
- Type: Private
- Industry: Forestry equipment, Landscape maintenance
- Founded: 1926; 100 years ago
- Founder: Andreas Stihl
- Headquarters: Waiblingen, Germany
- Key people: Nikolas Stihl (chairman of Stihl Holding AG & Co. KG); Eva Stihl (vice chairperson)
- Products: Industrial chainsaws, string trimmers, cultivators, cut-off saws, leaf blowers, construction tools, edgers, pole pruners, augers/drills & protective apparel
- Revenue: €5.479 billion (2025)
- Number of employees: 20,246 (2025)
- Website: stihl.com

Andreas Stihl AG & Co. (commonly referred to as Stihl and styled as STIHL, /stiːl/, German: [ʃtiːl]) is a German manufacturer of handheld power equipment. It is headquartered in Waiblingen, Baden-Württemberg, near Stuttgart, Germany. Stihl was founded in 1926 by Andreas Stihl, an innovator in early chainsaw production. Stihl operates the global Stihl Timbersports Series.

== Company history ==
Andreas Stihl designed and hand built his first chainsaw in 1926. The saw was electrically powered, and weighed about 48 kg (106 lb). Stihl grew slowly initially, as the chainsaws came to the market about the same time as the Great Depression; with manpower cheap, and old two-man saws proven, there was no need for power saws. In 1930, Stihl created the first ever chainsaw that could be operated by only one person. The company continued to grow and in 1931 it became the first European company to export chainsaws to the United States and the Soviet Union.

During the Second World War, the company operated in Bad Cannstatt as "A. Stihl Maschinenfabrik". After the factory was badly damaged in bombings in 1943–1944, it was moved to Neustadt (now Waiblingen). The company employed about 250 people in 1939, and during the war, it also employed many slave labourers. In 1945, Stihl, a Nazi Party and Allgemeine SS member, was arrested by Allied troops and his company was seized. After three years' detention, he was classified as a Mitläufer and released, and his company was returned.

Stihl has been the biggest chainsaw manufacturing company in the world since 1971. In the mid-1970s, Stihl expanded the company by building manufacturing plants in Brazil and in the United States. Much of the increased demand came from the construction and landscaping markets, although in Brazil it was mainly forest clearance. Along with the professional markets, Stihl designed many home-use equipment, like blowers, line trimmers, edgers, and chainsaws.

In the 1970s while building chainsaws, Stihl entered the small engine market contracting the Japanese company Komatsu to make products like blowers (e.g. BG60) and brush cutters (e.g. FS80) for several years until Stihl designed their own. Early in the market, Stihl contracted Ryobi to build the FS36\FS44 for the early lower price point brush cutters before making their own like the FS75.

In 1992, Stihl acquired Viking, an Austrian company.

In 2008, the newest Stihl production facility opened in Qingdao, China. In December 2008, Stihl acquired the carburetor producer Zama to safeguard the supply and to enter a new business segment with growth potential.

== Subsidiaries ==
STIHL Australia was established in 1971. It was the first subsidiary company established by the STIHL Group outside of Europe. The company is headquartered in Knoxfield, Victoria, and has state offices in Queensland and Western Australia. STIHL Australia has a network of around 650 dealers across the country.

STIHL US: Incorporated in Delaware, Stihl Inc. is the US subsidiary of Stihl International GmbH and is based in Virginia Beach, Virginia. Construction of the facilities there began in 1974. Along with the manufacturing facilities, there are also warehouses and administration buildings at the 150-acre complex. Stihl Inc. employs almost 2,000 employees on 2 million square feet of buildings.

STIHL UK: Andreas Stihl Ltd was founded in 1978 in the United Kingdom.

== Product gallery ==
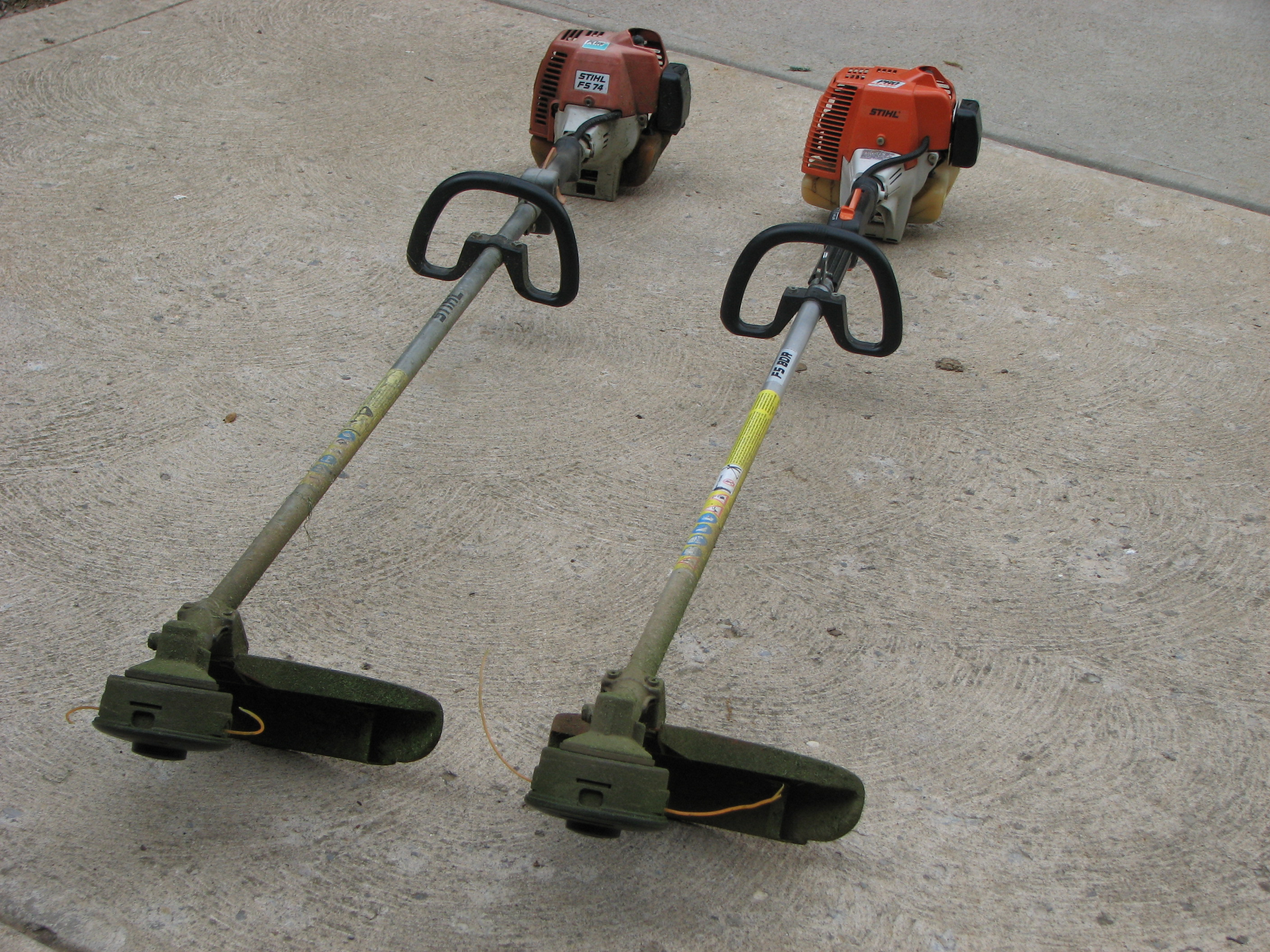
Stihl gasoline-powered trimmers. Mid-1990s model FS74, left, and 2004 model FS80R, right.

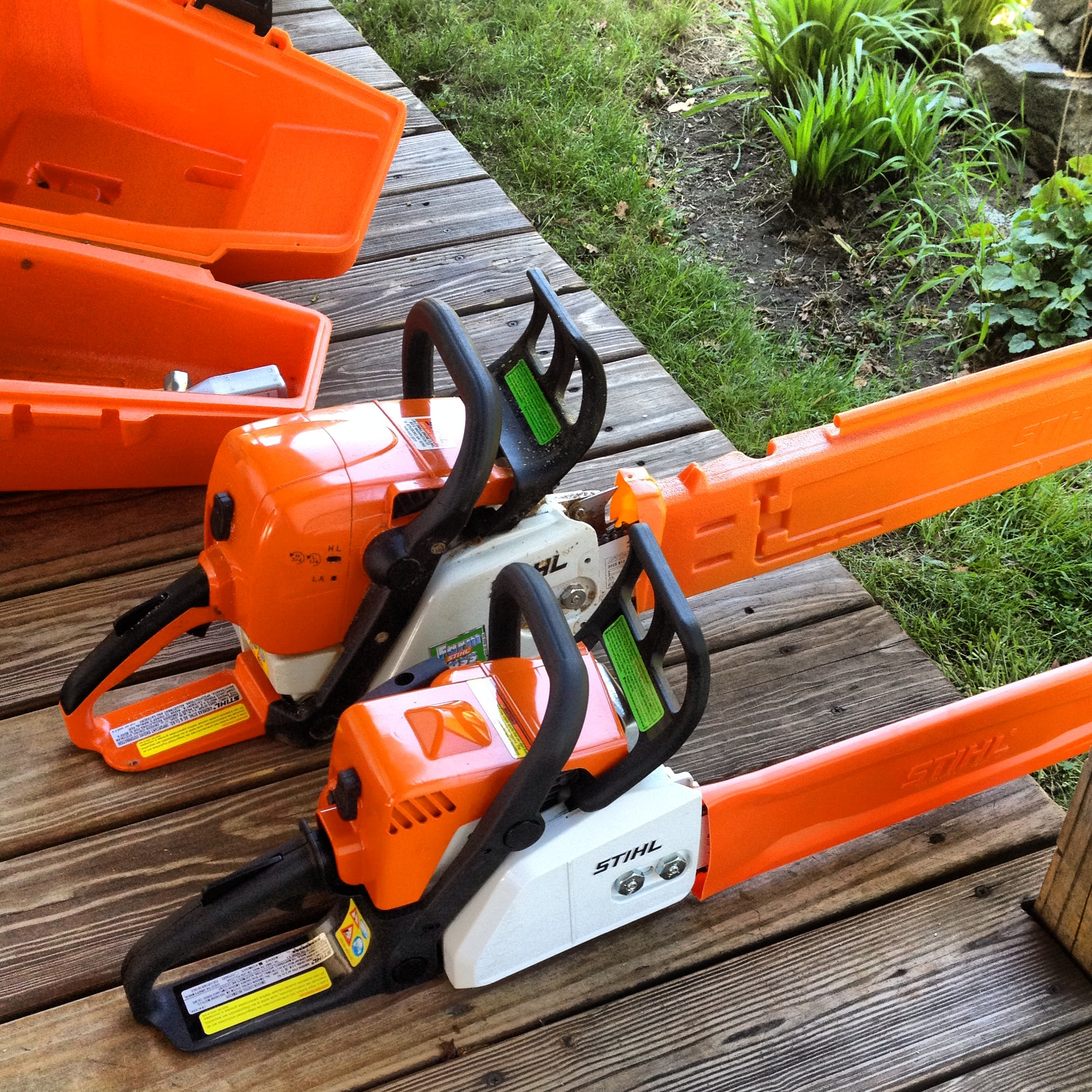
Stihl gasoline-powered chainsaws: MS 170 (foreground), MS 290 Farm Boss (background)

== Sponsorships ==
=== Air Racing ===
- (United States) National Championship Air Races (title sponsor, 2016–present)

=== Football ===
- (India) NorthEast United (2019–2021)
