= Yamabiko Corporation =

Japanese power tool manufacturer

- Native name: 株式会社やまびこ
- Type: Public KK
- Traded as: TYO: 6250
- ISIN: JP3943000004
- Industry: Machinery
- Predecessor: Kioritz Corporation; Shindaiwa Corporation
- Founded: December 1, 2008; 17 years ago (through merger)
- Headquarters: Ōme, Tokyo 198-8760, Japan
- Area served: Worldwide
- Key people: Hiroshi Kubo (President and CEO)
- Products: Outdoor machinery; Agricultural machinery; General industrial machinery
- Revenue: JPY 111.9 (FY 2016) (US$ 1.03 billion) (FY 2016)
- Net income: JPY 2.3 billion (FY 2016) (US$ 22 million) (FY 2016)
- Number of employees: 3,117 (as of March 31, 2017)
- Website: Official website

The Yamabiko Corporation (株式会社やまびこ, Kabushiki-gaisha Yamabiko) is a Japanese manufacturer of power tools formed by the September 2008 merger of the Kioritz and Shindaiwa corporations. The brands owned and distributed by Yamabiko are Kioritz, Shindaiwa and Echo. The Yamabiko Corporation is based in Ome, Japan.

Yamabiko exports parts to their facility in Lake Zurich, Illinois, and assembled Echo and Shindaiwa products there for sale in the US.

== History ==
=== Kioritz Corporation ===

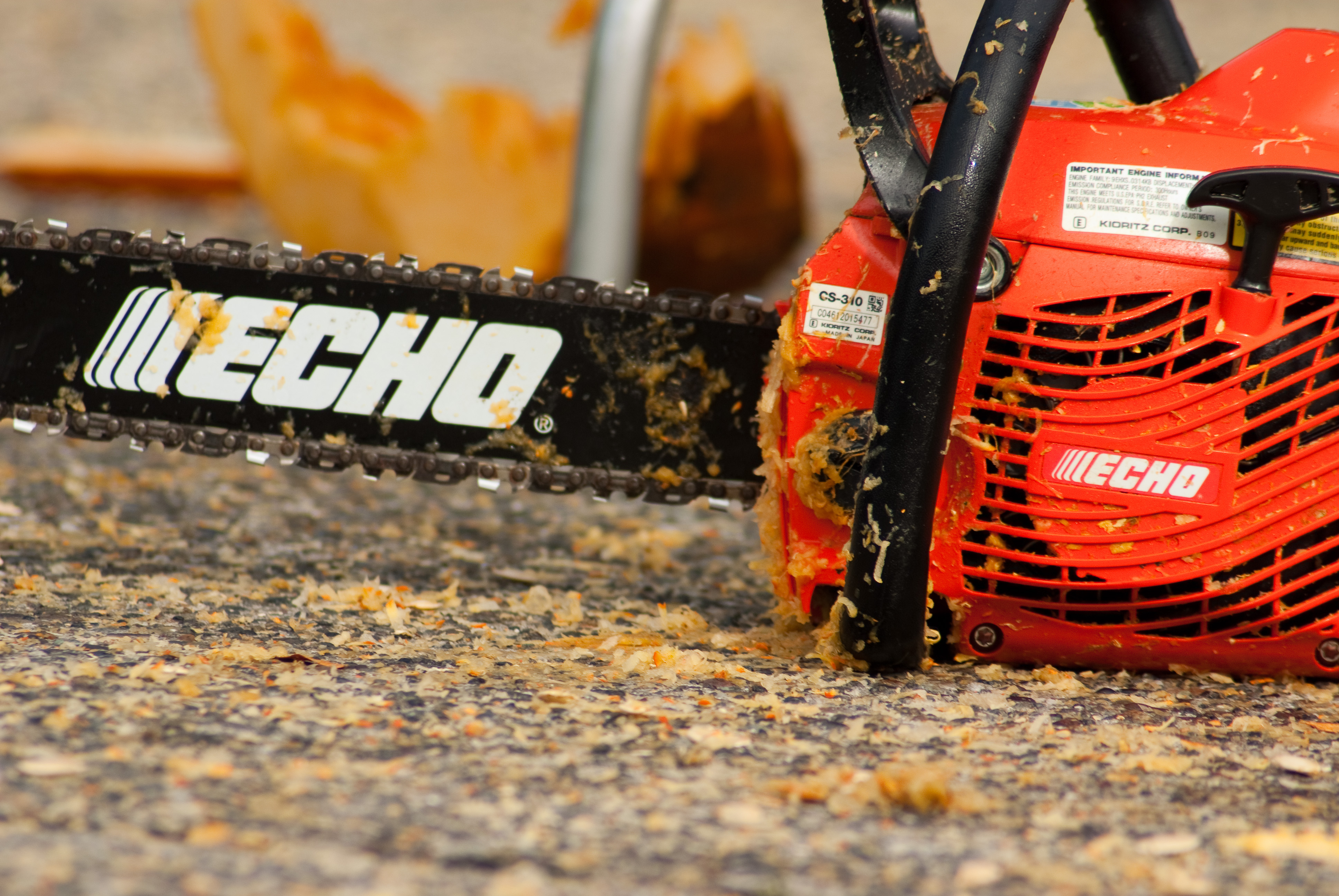
Echo chainsaw with Kioritz labels at red enclosure

(Japanese: 共立) (Kyōritsu) was a global manufacturer of forestry and agricultural machinery, and also outdoor power equipment. The company was founded in September 1947 by the Asamoto brothers, primarily to manufacture agricultural machinery. Until 1971, the company operated under the name Kyoritsu Noki. In 1971, the company changed its name to the Kioritz Corporation and launched the CS-302, its first 'professional' saw and the first to bear a distinctive orange casing. It began trading under the Echo brand name in 1978.

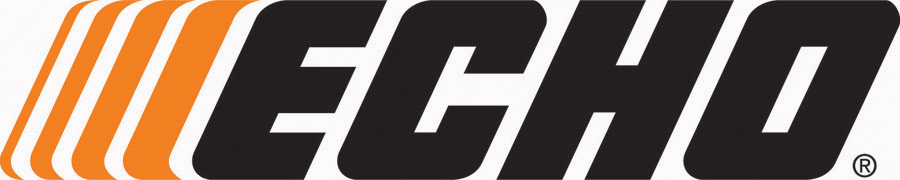
Echo brand logo

In its founding year, the company launched a revolutionary engine-powered manual crop duster. Until the 1960s, the company concentrated on the manufacture of power dusters, mist blowers and other pest control machinery. The first Kyoritsu Noki brushcutter was introduced in 1960 and three years later, the company launched its first chainsaw, the Echo CS-80, and the first Kyoritsu Noki tool to bear the "Echo" brand name. In 1970, Kyoritsu claimed to have 'revolutionized' outdoor cleaning with the PB-9, a backpack power blower. The Echo brand of hand-held petrol powered tools including chainsaws, brushcutters, hedge trimmers and leaf blowers are manufactured in Yokosuka and Morioka, with other major plants in Shenzhen, China, and Lake Zurich, Illinois.

=== Shindaiwa Incorporated ===
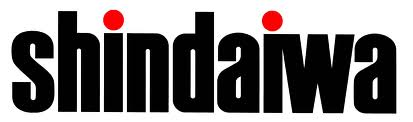
Shindaiwa brand logo

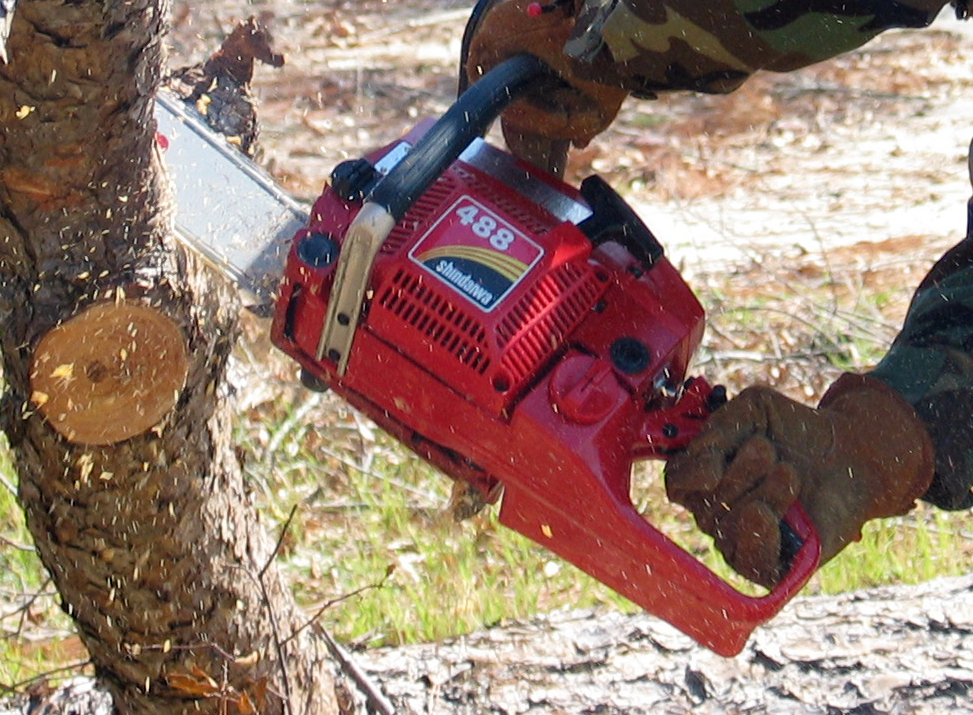
Shindaiwa chainsaw

Shindaiwa Incorporated is a global manufacturer of welding machines, generators, agricultural and forestry machinery, and outdoor power equipment. The company originally manufactured electrical and industrial products. Shindaiwa launched its first chainsaw in Japan in 1955. In September 2008, the company merged with Kioritz to form the Yamabiko Corporation. The manufacture of Shindaiwa products in Japan takes place in Yokosuka, Morioka, and Hiroshima, with other plants in Shenzhen, China, and Lake Zurich, Illinois.

=== Merger ===
On 1 September 2008, Kioritz and Shindaiwa merged under one holding company, the Yamabiko Corporation.
