= Andreas Stihl =

German inventor (1896–1973)

- Born: 10 November 1896; Zürich, Switzerland
- Died: 14 January 1973 (aged 76); Rohrbronn, West Germany
- Occupations: Founder of Stihl, inventor of the first electric chainsaw

Andreas Stihl (10 November 1896 – 14 January 1973) was a Swiss-born German engineer and important inventor in the area of chainsaws, and the founder of Andreas Stihl AG & Company KG. He is often hailed as the "Father of the chainsaw".

== Early life ==
Stihl went to the Volksschule in Zürich, before moving to relatives in Germany. He attended the Realschule in Singen (Baden-Württemberg) and the Gymnasium in Düsseldorf-Oberkassel. From 1915 until his dismissal by injuries in 1917, Stihl fought in the First World War in the German Army. From 1917 until 1920, he studied mechanical engineering in Eisenach.

== Invention of the chainsaw ==
In 1923, together with his friend Carl Hohl, he founded an engineering firm in Stuttgart, which was dissolved in 1926. Stihl founded a new company, for steam boiler pre-firing systems, in the same year.

He also patented the "Cutoff Chainsaw for Electric Power" in 1926, which weighed a hefty 64 kilograms and had a one-inch gauge chain with handles at either end. Due to its bulk, it required two people to operate. It was, however, the first electric chainsaw worldwide. In 1929, Stihl built a petrol powered chainsaw, named the "tree-felling machine", two years after fellow German Emil Lerp had built the first one worldwide. The following year, Stihl created the first ever chainsaw that could be operated by only one person. The company continued to grow and in 1931 it became the first European company to export chainsaws to the United States and the Soviet Union. Stihl has been the biggest chainsaw manufacturing company in the world since 1971.

== Nazi Party membership ==
Stihl was a member of the Nazi Party from 1933 and of the Allgemeine SS from 1935. He was not called for military service during the war, and instead ran his company as the "A. Stihl Maschinenfabrik" in Bad Canstatt. After the factory was badly damaged in bombings in 1943–1944, it was moved to Neustadt (now Waiblingen). The company employed about 250 people in 1939, and during the war it also employed some number of slave labourers. At the end of the war he was arrested by Allied troops and his company was seized. After three years' detention, he was classified as a Mitläufer, released, and had his company returned.

== Personal life ==
In 1929, Andreas Stihl married Mia Giersch (1903–2002), with whom he had four children, among them Hans Peter Stihl (born 1932) and Eva Mayr-Stihl (1935–2022), who succeeded her father in managing the company and remaining Vorstand until 2002. Stihl divorced his first wife in 1960, and married Hannelore Wegener-Doberg (1927–2009) the same year.
