= Upwey railway station (Abbotsbury Railway) =

Disused railway station in Dorset, England

Upwey

General information
- Location: Broadwey, Dorset; England
- Coordinates: 50.6511°N 2.4715°W
- Grid reference: SY666836
- Platforms: 1

Other information
- Status: Disused

History
- Original company: Abbotsbury Railway
- Pre-grouping: GWR
- Post-grouping: Western Region of British Railways

Key dates
- 9 November 1885: Opened as Broadway
- 24 June 1896: Renamed Broadwey
- 12 January 1906: Renamed Broadwey (Dorset)
- 1 January 1913: Renamed Upwey
- 1 December 1952: Closed to passengers
- 1 January 1962: Closed completely
Location

Upwey was a railway station on the Abbotsbury branch railway in the county of Dorset in England.

== History ==
The station was opened as Broadway on 9 November 1885 by the Abbotsbury Railway when it opened the line from Abbotsbury to Upwey Junction on the Great Western Railway (GWR) (former Wilts, Somerset and Weymouth Railway line).

It was renamed Broadwey in 1896, then Broadwey (Dorset) in 1906 and finally the name was changed to Upwey in 1913, to avoid confusion with Broadway in Worcestershire.

Although it had a passenger platform, it mainly functioned as a goods depot as the location of Upwey Junction on an embankment made access difficult. There was a goods shed, cattle pens and a 5 ton crane.

The station was host to a GWR camp coach from 1936 to 1939. When the branch closed to passengers in 1952, the station continued on as a goods depot until 1962, served by a stub from what is now the South West Main Line.

== Buildings ==
A typical William Clarke stone building served the single platform. The site of the station is now a builders yard with the station building and goods shed still in place.

Preceding station	Disused railways	Following station
Upwey Junction; South West Main Line	Great Western Railway; Abbotsbury branch railway	Coryates Halt; Line and station closed

== Bibliography ==
- Grant, Donald J. (2017). Directory of the Railway Companies of Great Britain (1st ed.). Kibworth Beauchamp, Leicestershire: Troubador Publishing Ltd. ISBN 978-1-78803-768-6.
- Hurst, Geoffrey (1992). Register of Closed Railways: 1948-1991. Worksop, Nottinghamshire: Milepost Publications. ISBN 0-9477-9618-5.
- McRae, Andrew (1997). British Railway Camping Coach Holidays: The 1930s & British Railways (London Midland Region). Vol. Scenes from the Past: 30 (Part One). Foxline. ISBN 1-870119-48-7.
- Quick, Michael (2022) [2001]. Railway passenger stations in Great Britain: a chronology (PDF). version 5.04. Railway & Canal Historical Society. Archived from the original (PDF) on 25 November 2022.
- The Railway Clearing House (1970) [1904]. The Railway Clearing House Handbook of Railway Stations 1904 (1970 D&C Reprint ed.). Newton Abbot: David & Charles Reprints. ISBN 0-7153-5120-6.
