= Creekside Discovery Centre =

Nature reserve in Lewisham, London

- Interactive map of Creekside Discovery Centre
- Location: Deptford in the London Borough of Lewisham, London, United Kingdom
- Coordinates: 51.4779°N 0.0204°W
- Opened: 1999
- Owner: National Grid
- Operator: Creekside Education Trust
- Visitors: 50,000 since 2002
- Awards: Runner up in the Introducing Young People to Nature in the Growing Localities Awards, 2013.
- Habitats: Brownfield
- Facilities: Education centre
- Website: Official website

The Creekside Discovery Centre is a 0.5-hectare (1.2-acre) natural habitat in Deptford in the London Borough of Lewisham. It is owned by the National Grid and managed by the Creekside Education Trust. Formerly a gas works, the centre is a brownfield habitat incorporating the only existing sloping beach into Deptford Creek. Other habitats on the site include a pond, constructed in a project coordinated by the Creekside Education Trust in partnership with Lewisham College, and a sandbank, built in 2001.

== History ==
The Creekside Centre became a nature reserve as a result of an agreement between the Creekside Renewal Project and British Gas, the latter was unable to build on the site due to the existence of a large-diameter gas pipe on the site.

In 2015 the Friend’s of Creekside scheme was launched to help fund the charity, develop on-site facilities, and raise local awareness of the nature reserve.

The site contains a 250kg propeller from a former Scottish fishing boat, the Northern Star.

== Wildlife ==
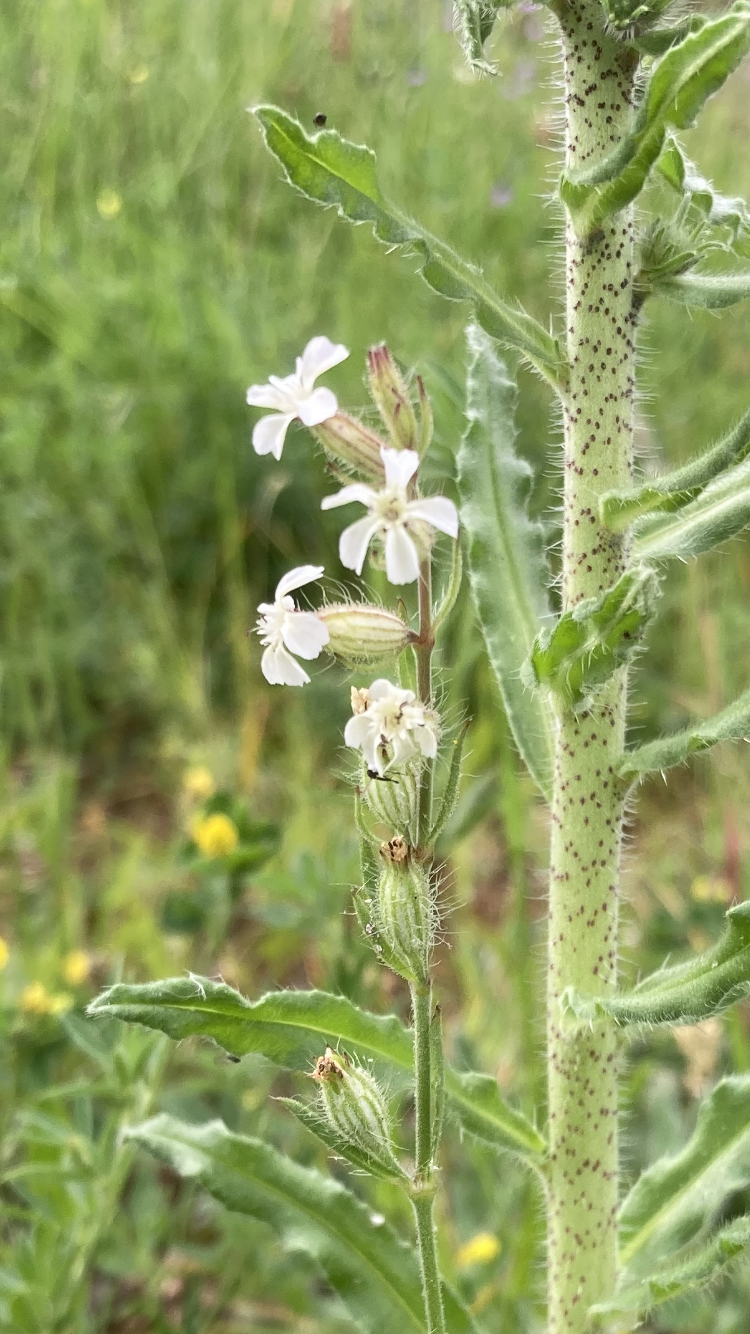
A small-flowered catchfly at Creekside Discovery Centre

Historically the site has been associated with the black redstart, although habitat destruction in the wider area has meant they are no longer present. In 2011 sand martins began nesting in the sandbank on the site.

Two nationally rare species of wasps have been found on the site; the spider-hunting wasp Auplopus carbonarius and the mason wasp Microdynerus exilis.

The Creekside Discovery Centre is the only site in London on which the critically endangered small-flowered catchfly, a wildflower on the Plantlife Red List, has been identified. Across the surrounding conservation area, 300 species of wildflower have been identified.

== Architecture ==
The original plans to develop an educational facility on the site involved a floating centre located in the creek itself. The eventual building design built was a timber framed, cedar-clad building, incorporating a brown roof was constructed in 2002 at a cost of £500,000.

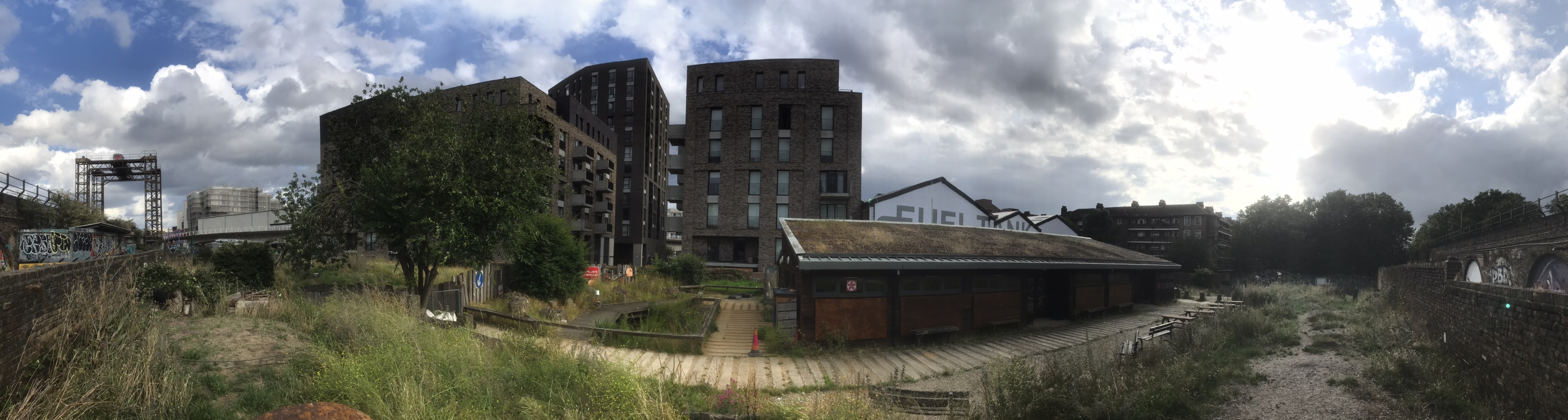
Panorama of the Creekside Discovery Centre

== Events ==
The Creekside Centre provides educational sessions for local schools, guided walks along Deptford Creek, special events for the public, and venue hire.

In 2012 the site hosted a performance of the Odyssey by local theatre group Teatro Vivo.

== Funding ==
The Creekside Centre has received funding from various sources including the City Bridge Trust. Since the autumn of 2020 the centre has received funding grants through a partnership with the company constructing the Thames Tideway Tunnel.
