= Coryat =

Coryat is a surname. Notable people with the surname include:

- Thomas Coryat (c. 1577–1617), English traveller
- Karl Coryat, American writer, comedian, and musician
  - Coryat scores, a means of measuring success on the American quiz show Jeopardy!, developed by Karl Coryat, who was himself a Jeopardy! champion

== See also ==
- Coryates, village in Dorset, UK
- Coryat's Crudities, travelogue
