= Abbotsbury Swannery =

Bird colony in the United Kingdom

Coordinates: 50.6538°N 2.6029°W

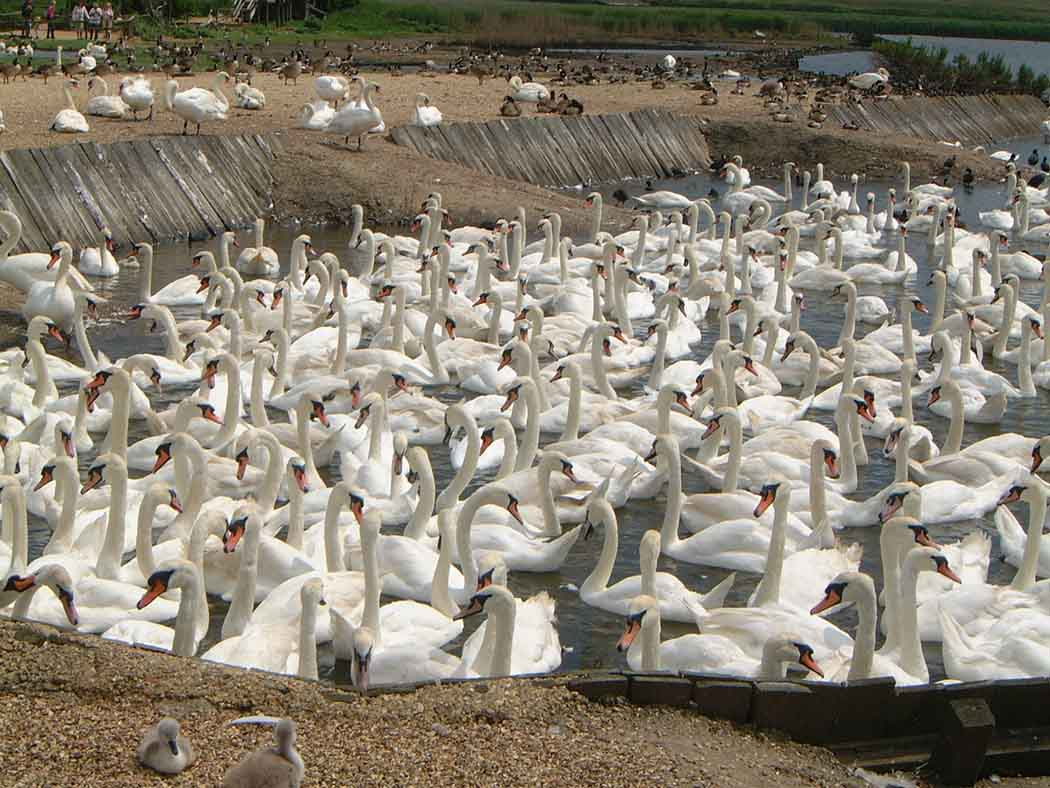
Swans in the main bay at Abbotsbury

Abbotsbury Swannery is a colony of nesting mute swans near the village of Abbotsbury in Dorset, England. Located on a 1-hectare (2-acre) site around the Fleet Lagoon protected from the weather of Lyme Bay by Chesil Beach, it is the only managed swannery in the world, and can number over 600 swans with around 150 pairs. Written records of the swannery's existence go back to 1393, though it probably existed well before then and is believed to have been set up by Benedictine monks in the eleventh century.

== History ==
The Fleet lagoon formed at the end of the last ice age as melt water flooded behind the already formed Chesil Beach leaving shallow salty water in which plants grew profusely producing an ideal environment for wildfowl and water birds. The Benedictine monastery of St. Peter's was established on the site in the eleventh century when King Cnut gave the land to his steward, Orc, and the monks managed the swans as a ready source of meat for use at their lavish banquets.

The swannery was used by the monks until 1539 when the monastery was dissolved by King Henry VIII. The ruined remains of the monastery are still visible near the Church of St. Nicholas, Abbotsbury. The site was then purchased by Sir Giles Strangways, and has remained in the ownership of the Strangways family through fifteen generations up to the present day; an estate of some 61 square kilometres (15,000 acres) in Dorset covering Chesil Beach and Abbotsbury is still held by the Ilchester Estate owned by Mrs Charlotte Townshend, the daughter of the 9th Viscount Galway, a descendant of the first Countess of Ilchester.

== The swannery today ==
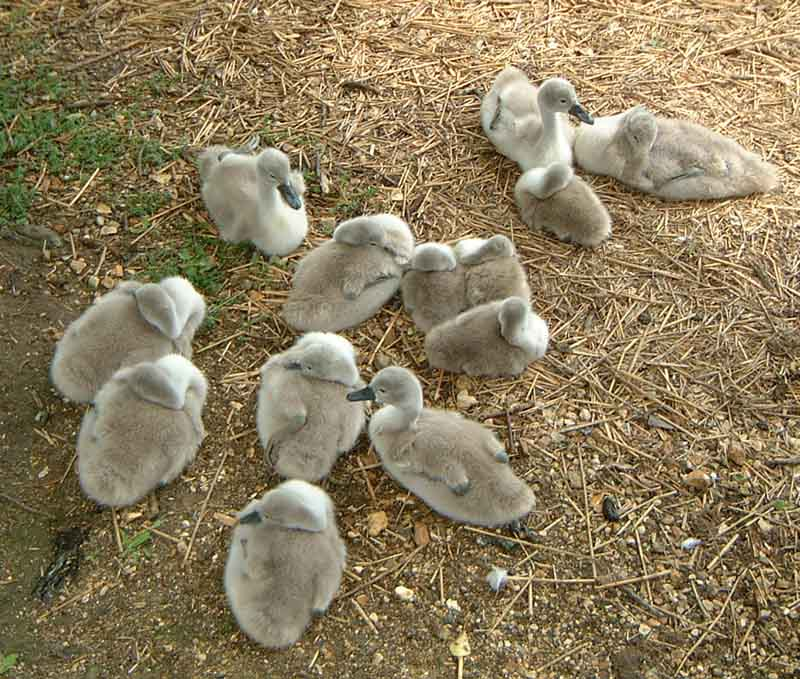
Cygnets at Abbotsbury

The Fleet, beside which the swannery sits, is the largest lagoon in England, and runs for about 13 kilometres (8.1 mi) along the Dorset coast. It is brackish and tidal, but sheltered by Chesil Beach, and is a Ramsar site of international importance and a Site of Special Scientific Interest, and has been a nature reserve since as early as 1393. The swannery is at its westerly extremity.

Abbotsbury Swannery is today a tourist attraction and the swans have become accustomed to the presence of visitors and allow close but respectful approach even in the nesting season when cygnets are on the nest. Before viewing the swans, visitors can look at the Decoyman's House which sets the scene for the visit with a display explaining how the colony has been managed over the years and how the present situation has evolved. Apart from the swans, the Fleet and Chesil Beach attracts many species of waterfowl and over 300 different varieties have been recorded leading to the area being designated as a Site of Special Scientific Interest (SSSI), a Special Protected Area (SPA) and a Special Area of Conservation (SAC).

Nesting mute swans are usually intensely territorial, so it is unusual to see this many pairs in proximity to each other. However, the closeness of the nests can sometimes lead to problems as newly hatched cygnets can become attached to the wrong parent bird; to overcome this, rearing pens are used for a few selected families who need more privacy. The daily feeding sessions take place at noon and 4 p.m. A large mass of the birds gather round; children are invited to help with the feeding.

At the end of July, the swans become flightless, for around six weeks, due to the moulting of their feathers. Once every two years, the swans are rounded up, so that they can be examined, weighed and measured and any new birds to the colony ringed. The round-up is undertaken by around 50 canoes that start at the eastern end of the lagoon and slowly drive the birds into the swannery bay at Abbotsbury. In the past the round-up has resulted in over 900 birds being caught and recorded, but it varies from year to year.

Today, there are around 600 swans. They are free-flying birds and could choose to nest anywhere, but are obviously attracted by the Fleet Lagoon. Visitors can wander on small paths among the various nests, sometimes experiencing the birds' territorial displays. The swannery is open to the public between March and the end of October, and an interesting time to visit is between the middle of May and the end of June when young cygnets are present. Twice a day at noon and 4pm, mass feeding of the swans takes place.

== In popular culture ==
Abbotsbury Swannery was one of the filming locations for Patch Stop episodes of children's TV show Playdays.

Abbotsbury Swannery features on the cover of the Martha and the Muffins 1980 hit "Echo Beach".

== See also ==
- Wildfowl and Wetlands Trust
- Slimbridge Wildfowl Trust
