= Coryates Halt railway station =

Disused railway station in Dorset, England

Coryates Halt
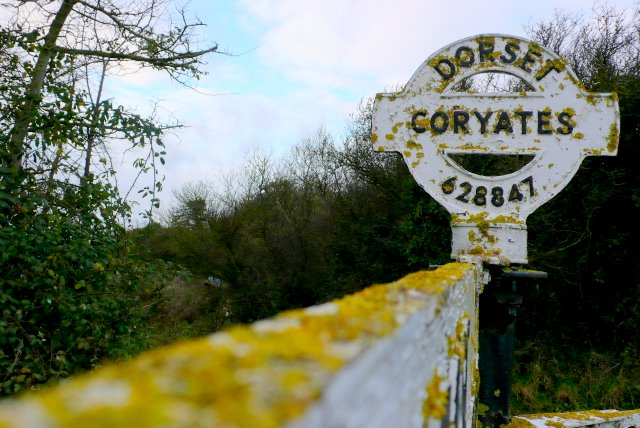
- This sign is located on Cheese Lane close to the site of the old railway bridge where the Abbotsbury branch line crossed

General information
- Location: Broadwey, Dorset; England
- Coordinates: 50.6609°N 2.5270°W
- Grid reference: SY628847
- Platforms: 1

Other information
- Status: Disused

History
- Original company: Great Western Railway
- Pre-grouping: Great Western Railway
- Post-grouping: Great Western Railway; Western Region of British Railways

Key dates
- 1 May 1906: Station opens
- 1 December 1952: Station closes
Location

Coryates Halt was a small railway station on the Abbotsbury branch railway in the west of the English county of Dorset. It consisted of a single platform and GWR pagoda shelter. Opened on 1 May 1906, it was sited next to an overbridge carrying a lane to a dairy and the villages of Coryates and Shilvinghampton. Part of a scheme that saw several halts opened on the GWR and other railways to counter road competition, it was served by Railmotors, carriages equipped with driving ends and their own small steam engine.

== Friar Waddon Milk Platform ==
This small platform at the two mile point of the branch, between Upwey and Coryates, was used to serve the local dairies and even had a Sunday train to get the milk to markets early on Monday morning in the days before domestic refrigeration was common.

The station and platform closed with the branch in 1952.

Preceding station	Disused railways	Following station
Upwey (formerly Broadwey); Line and station closed	Great Western Railway; Abbotsbury branch railway	Portesham; Line and station closed

== The site today ==
The remains of the wooden platform at Coryates slowly return to nature in the field next to the abutments of the former bridge.
