= Teatro Vivo =

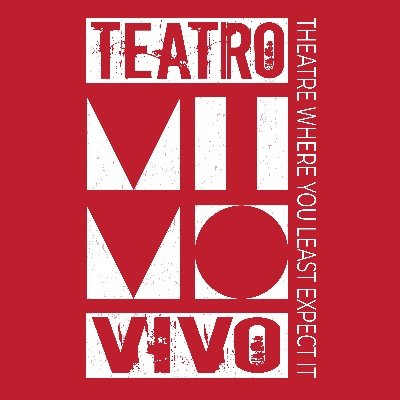
Teatro Vivo Company logo

Teatro Vivo is a site specific theatre company formed in south London, England, in 2005 by theatre director Sophie Austin. The company has expanded from its London base and performed shows in Oxford, Berkshire, Devon and Dorset as well as maintaining a strong presence in London. It creates both new work and adaptations with an element of audience participation, in non-theatre spaces and outdoor venues.

Major works by the company include The Odyssey (2012) on the streets of Deptford, London; Supermarket Shakespeare (2008–10), a series of stories based on Shakespeare plays in Sainsbury's supermarkets across London and Here But There, a retelling of Anton Chekhov's Three Sisters (2006/7) in the now defunct Theatre Museum in Covent Garden. Lyn Gardner writing in The Guardian described the production of Adventures in Wonderland (2013) as "full of raggle-taggle invention, and its cleverness lies in the way it casts the audience as co-conspirators."

Theatre writer Sarah Sigal says Teatro Vivo is an ensemble "focussed on the centrality of the actor/performer's contribution to the process of theatre making and a kind of collaboration wherein all company members make significant contributions to the process."

The Guardian, in an editorial on the company's work said:

Almost anywhere is a possible stage for this most creative of theatre groups. The challenge they set themselves is to break free of tradition, reinterpret the classics and collaborate with their often youthful audience. It is a conspiracy to entertain and provoke that invites the onlooker to be co-conspirator. Absolutely not the West End. Take a raincoat.

== Overview ==
Theatre director Sophie Austin formed the company immediately after graduating from the B.A in Theatre Directing Course at Rose Bruford College, London:

"My aim was to create theatre with like minded creatives who enjoyed making work for a new audiences. I had no money for rehearsal space or theatre hire so we had our first meeting in a café and staged our first play in a park. What started out as a budgetary constraint became a central ethos for the company. By performing in these public spaces we were able to reach a really diverse audience and by collaborating with these spaces to tell a story, we were challenged and inspired in equal measure."

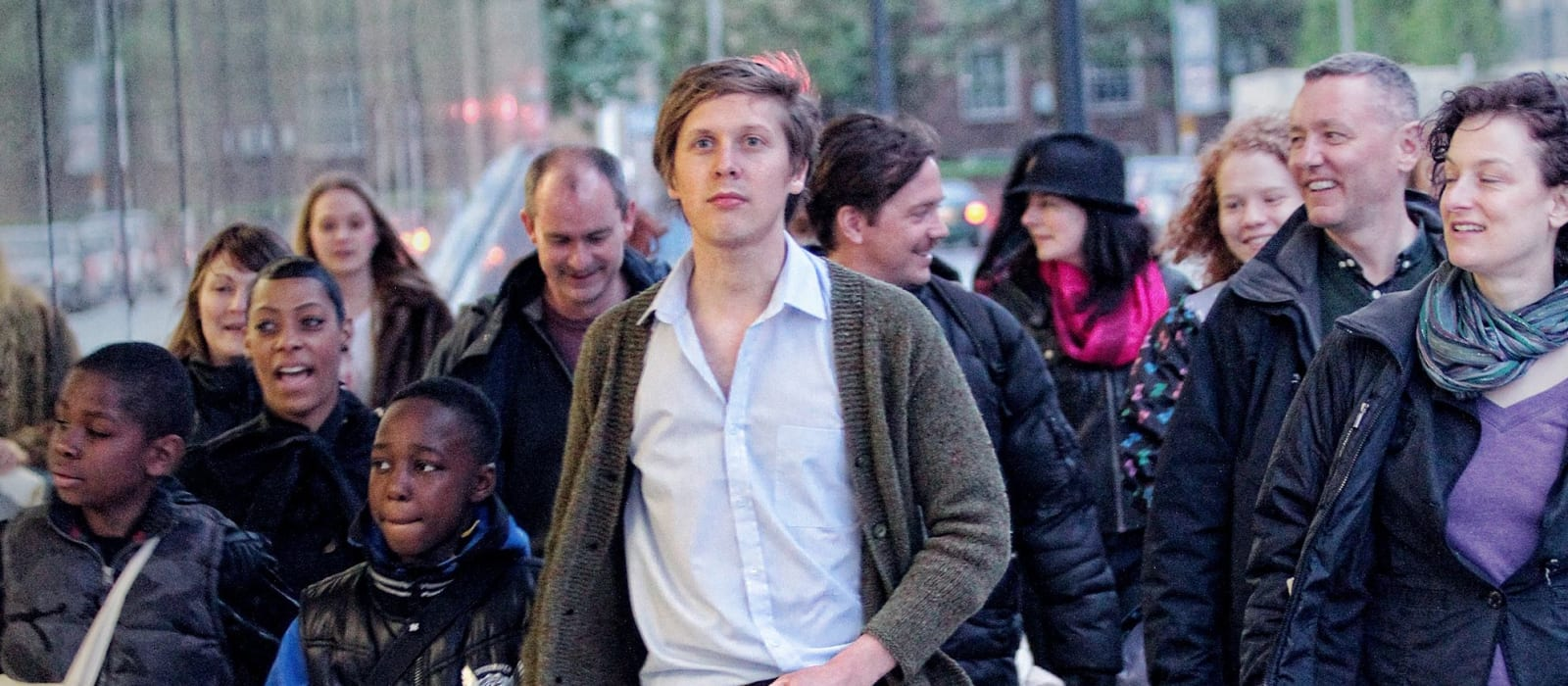
Will Close in Teatro Vivo's The Odyssey in Deptford, London 2012

Austin's key collaborators since the first production have been Mark Stevenson, who responded to an advert placed in local arts venues in Lewisham, where Austin lived, Laura Hooper and Kas Darley.

The company have formed working partnerships with The Albany Theatre, Deptford, with whom they are an associate company, Greenwich and Lewisham Young People's Theatre (GLYPT), and Dash Arts.

Austin stepped down as artistic director in July 2019, with Stevenson and Darley becoming joint artistic directors.

In response to lockdown restrictions imposed as a result of the COVID-19 pandemic in 2020 the company put on a special set of online performances of their show the Grimms Collecting Agency, in which they advertised for people to be interviewed. The ‘Grimms’ met people on Zoom and listened to their stories about life under lockdown. This was the first time the company had produced a filmic piece.

In June 2021 the company staged their first production in Dorset, an adaptation of the legend of Ondine at St Catherine's Chapel in Abbotsbury.

In 2021 Teatro Vivo created The Regulars in collaboration with the INN CROWD, a show specifically designed for performance in pubs through 2021 and 2022. There were performances in Dorset and Somerset, and for the first time the company performed in the north of England, in Preston and Blackburn, Lancashire.

On March 18, 2022, Teatro Vivo were announced as Artists of Change alongside Dima Karout. Artists of Change is a new programme of arts residencies, developed in collaboration with Lewisham Council, for its tenure as Borough of Culture.

== Selected productions ==
Production	Based on/adapted from	Venue	Directed by	Year
Doing what Lovers Do	Romeo and Juliet by William Shakespeare	Manor House Gardens, Hither Green	Sophie Austin	2005
Lovers and Liars	Twelfth Night by William Shakespeare	Manor House Gardens, Hither Green	Sophie Austin	2006
Here but There	Three Sisters by Anton Chekhov	Manor House Library, Lewisham and The Theatre Museum, Covent Garden	Sophie Austin	October 2006 and June 2007
Hothouse	Devised	Arcola Theatre, Dalston; Bakehouse Theatre, Blackheath; Horniman Museum, Forest Hill; Albany Theatre, Lewisham	Sophie Austin	November 2008 and September 2009
Supermarket Shakespeare	Based on the plays of William Shakespeare	Sainsbury's, Lee Green; Sainsbury's, New Cross; Sainsbury's Forest Hill; Sainsbury's, Lewisham	Sophie Austin	April 2008 April 2009 April 2010
The Odyssey	Written by Vic Bryson, Sarah Sigal and Michael Wagg; based on Odyssey by Homer	Urban promenade performance in Deptford, London	Sophie Austin	June and September 2012
After the Tempest	The Tempest by William Shakespeare	staged in five parks across London	Sophie Austin	Summer 2013
Adventures in Wonderland	Alice's Adventures in Wonderland by Lewis Carroll	Manor House Library, Lewisham; Catford Broadway Theatre; The Story Museum, Oxford and the Watermill Theatre, Newbury	Sophie Austin	October 2010 July 2011 March 2012 July 2013
Mother Courage and Her Children	Mother Courage and Her Children by Bertolt Brecht	The Royal Arsenal site, Woolwich	Sophie Austin	September 2013
The Hunter's Grimm	Grimms' Fairy Tales by Brothers Grimm; additional writing by Michael Wagg	Deptford Library; Newbury Watermill; Stratford, London and Catford Broadway Theatre	Sophie Austin	2014 and 2019
The Residents	Written by Teatro Vivo and Michael Wagg	Various houses in London	Sophie Austin	2016
Twistov	Written by Michael Wagg; inspired by Oliver Twist by Charles Dickens	The streets of Shoreditch, London	Sophie Austin	October 2017
Evelyn's Roots	Written by Bernadette Russell & Gareth Brierley	The streets of Evelyn Ward, Deptford	Sophie Austin	July 2018
The House That Slipped	Devised	Online performances	Mark Stevenson	August 2020
Ondine	Vic Bryson, based on the legend of Ondine	St Catherine's Chapel, Abbotsbury, Dorset	Mark Stevenson	June 2021
Dangerous Games	Vic Bryson, based on Les Liaisons dangereuses	Deptford, London and Weymouth, Dorset	Mark Stevenson and Kas Darley	March and April 2023
