= Portesham railway station =

Disused railway station in Dorset, England

Portesham

General information
- Location: Portesham, Dorset; England
- Coordinates: 50.6678°N 2.5607°W
- Platforms: 1

Other information
- Status: Disused

History
- Original company: Abbotsbury Railway
- Pre-grouping: Great Western Railway
- Post-grouping: Western Region of British Railways

Key dates
- 9 November 1885: Opened
- 1 December 1952: Closed
Location

Portesham was a small railway station serving the village of Portesham in the west of the English county of Dorset.

== Location ==
The station was situated across the fields from the village, not far from an underbridge that carried the line across the Weymouth to Abbotsbury road at a skewed angle. Just to the east of the station, an incline provided access to quarries near the Hardy Monument.

== History ==
The station was opened on 9 November 1885 by the Abbotsbury Railway when it opened the line from Abbotsbury to Upwey Junction on the Great Western Railway (GWR) (former Wilts, Somerset and Weymouth Railway line).

The station had a single platform and a passing loop. The goods shed was opposite the platform and functioned for the life of the branch. The station was the site of a GWR camp coach from 1935 to 1939.

The station closed with the branch on 1 December 1952.

== Buildings ==
A typical William Clarke stone building served the single platform,

== The site today ==
The station building is now part of a private dwelling and is used as a holiday let.

Preceding station	Disused railways	Following station
Coryates Halt; Line and station closed	Great Western Railway; Abbotsbury branch railway	Abbotsbury; Line and station closed

== Bibliography ==
- Fenton, Mike (1999). Camp Coach Holidays on the G.W.R. Wild Swan. ISBN 1-874103-53-4.
- Grant, Donald J. (2017). Directory of the Railway Companies of Great Britain (1st ed.). Kibworth Beauchamp, Leicestershire: Troubador Publishing Ltd. ISBN 978-1-78803-768-6.
- Hurst, Geoffrey (1992). Register of Closed Railways: 1948-1991. Worksop, Nottinghamshire: Milepost Publications. ISBN 0-9477-9618-5.
- McRae, Andrew (1997). British Railway Camping Coach Holidays: The 1930s & British Railways (London Midland Region). Vol. Scenes from the Past: 30 (Part One). Foxline. ISBN 1-870119-48-7.
- Quick, Michael (2022) [2001]. Railway passenger stations in Great Britain: a chronology (PDF). version 5.04. Railway & Canal Historical Society. Archived from the original (PDF) on 25 November 2022.
