= St Nicholas' Church, Abbotsbury =

Church in Dorset, England

St Nicholas' Church
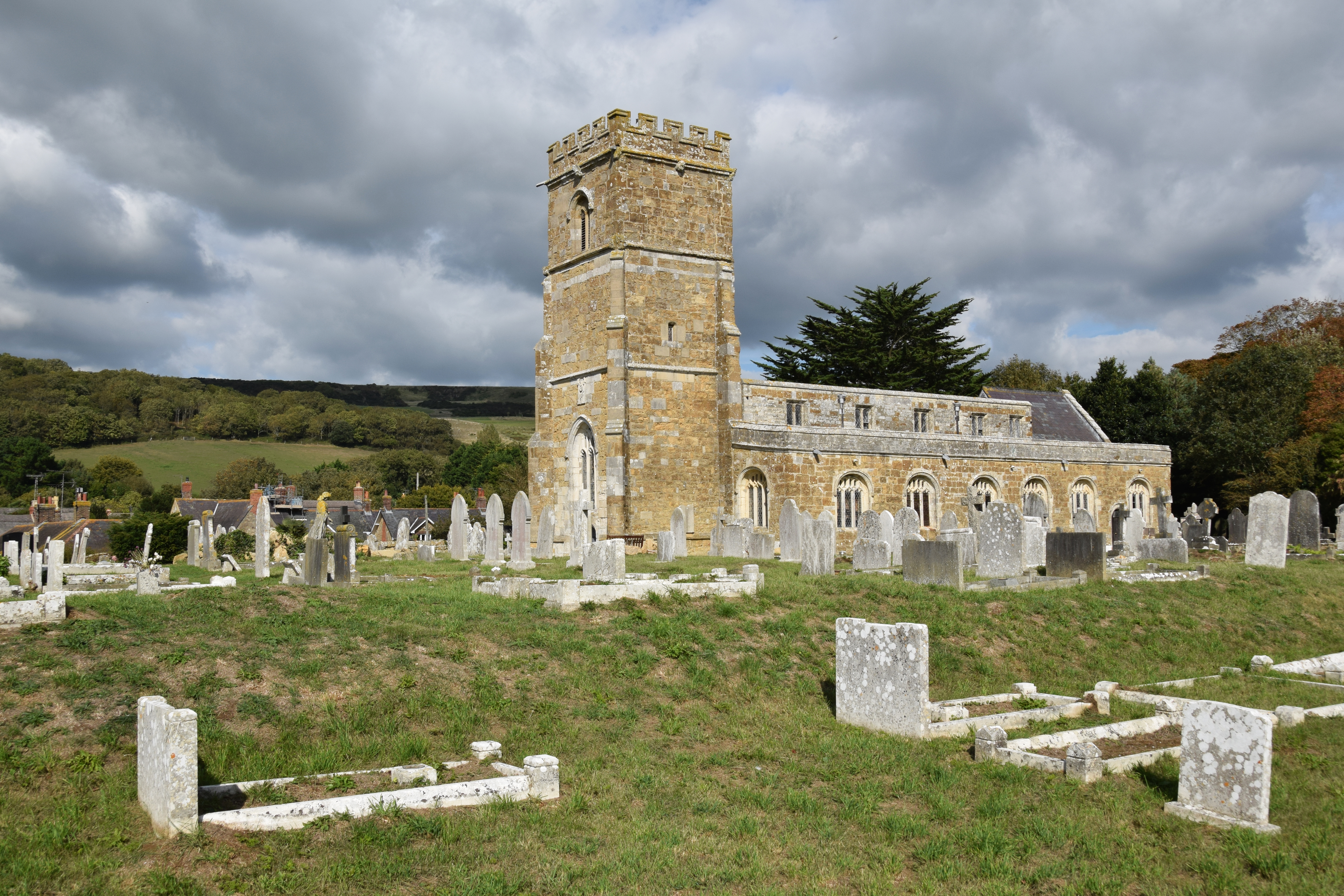
- St Nicholas' Church

Religion
- Affiliation: Church of England
- Ecclesiastical or organizational status: Active

Location
- Location: Abbotsbury, Dorset, England
- Interactive map of St Nicholas' Church
- Coordinates: 50.6649°N 2.5992°W

Architecture
- Type: Church

St Nicholas' Church is a Church of England church in Abbotsbury, Dorset, England. The earliest parts of the church date to the 14th century origin, with later alterations and extensions over the following centuries, including the construction of the west tower and north chapel in the 15th century. The church underwent restoration in 1807–08, 1885 and 1930.

The church's porch contains the effigy of an abbot of Abbotsbury Abbey. It was discovered on the site of the Abbey's church, St Peter's, in 1778, and has been given an approximate date of 1200. The Jacobean pulpit contains two bullet holes stemming from a fight in 1644, during the English Civil War, when Parliamentarians besieged Royalists at the church.

St Nicholas' has been Grade I listed since 1956. In 2015, the World War I memorial in the churchyard, dating to around 1920, became Grade II listed.
