= Abbotsbury railway station =

Disused railway station in Dorset, England

Abbotsbury
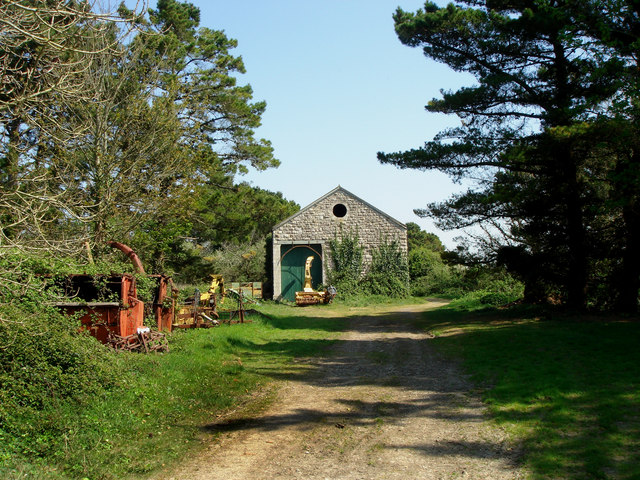

General information
- Location: Abbotsbury, Dorset; England
- Coordinates: 50.66586°N 2.59139°W
- Platforms: 1

Other information
- Status: Disused

History
- Opened: 9 November 1885
- Closed: 1 December 1952
- Original company: Abbotsbury Railway
- Pre-grouping: Great Western Railway
- Post-grouping: Great Western Railway; Western Region of British Railways
Location

Abbotsbury was the terminus of the Abbotsbury branch railway in the west of the English county of Dorset. Serving the village of Abbotsbury, it was sited amid fields to the east of the village on the Weymouth to Abbotsbury road, because the railway could not buy the land needed to build the station nearer to the village centre. Plans for westward expansion came to nothing and led to the railway petering out in a shallow cutting to the west of the station.

== History ==
The Great Western Railway first opened a line to Weymouth on 20 January 1857 which allowed trains from Paddington and Waterloo to service the town. In 1872 a six mile branch of the Weymouth line at Upwey to Abbotsbury was proposed but it took until 1877 to get the Bill through parliament. Opened by the Abbotsbury Railway Company in 1885, the station was operated from the start by the Great Western Railway. The line then passed on to the Western Region of British Railways on nationalisation in 1948.

Preceding station	Disused railways	Following station
Portesham; Line and station closed	Great Western Railway; Abbotsbury branch railway	Terminus

== Buildings ==
A typical William Clarke stone building served the single platform. The station also had a signal box and engine shed, and although neither of these operated for long, the ruins of the engine shed remained until closure. The goods shed however functioned for the life of the branch.

The station closed with the branch in 1952.

== The site today ==
The station building has now been replaced with a private dwelling although the platform remains underneath the length of the building. The goods shed remains largely intact. Further west are the remains of the engine shed - the west end and south side very overgrown but mostly complete, but the north wall and roof are gone.

== Film ==
The station makes short appearances in the Powell and Pressburger film The Small Back Room.
