= Coryates =

Coordinates: 50.667532°N 2.525617°W

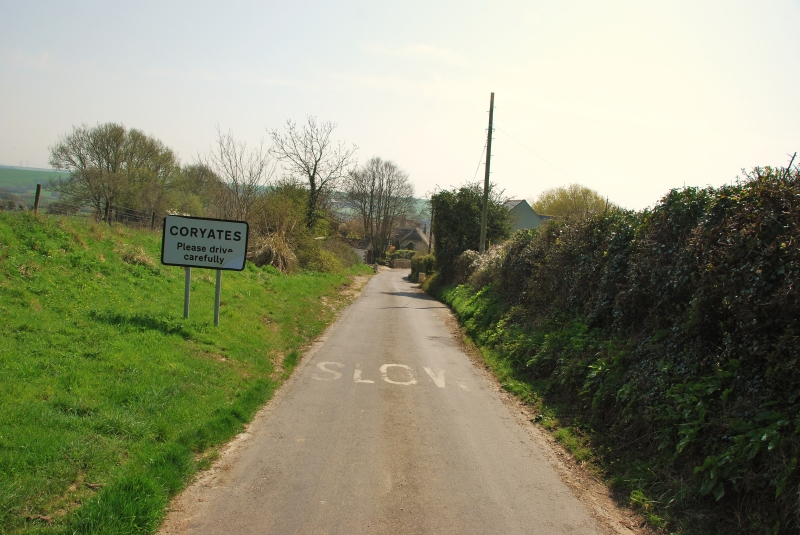
- Entrance sign to Coryates

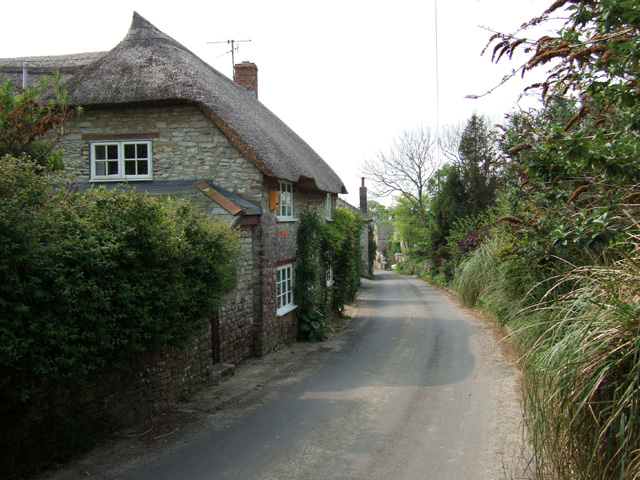
- Coryates village

- Location within Dorset
- Unitary authority: Dorset
- Ceremonial county: Dorset
- Region: South West
- Country: England
- Sovereign state: United Kingdom
- Police: Dorset
- Fire: Dorset and Wiltshire
- Ambulance: South Western
- UK Parliament: West Dorset

Coryates is a village in Dorset.

== History ==
Coryates Halt railway station opened in 1906 and closed in 1952.

== Politics ==
For UK general elections, Coryates is part of the West Dorset constituency.

Locally, Coryates is part of the Chesil Bank ward for elections to Dorset Council. From 1974 to 2019 it was in West Dorset district.
