= St Catherine's Chapel, Abbotsbury =

Chapel in Dorset, England

St Catherine's Chapel
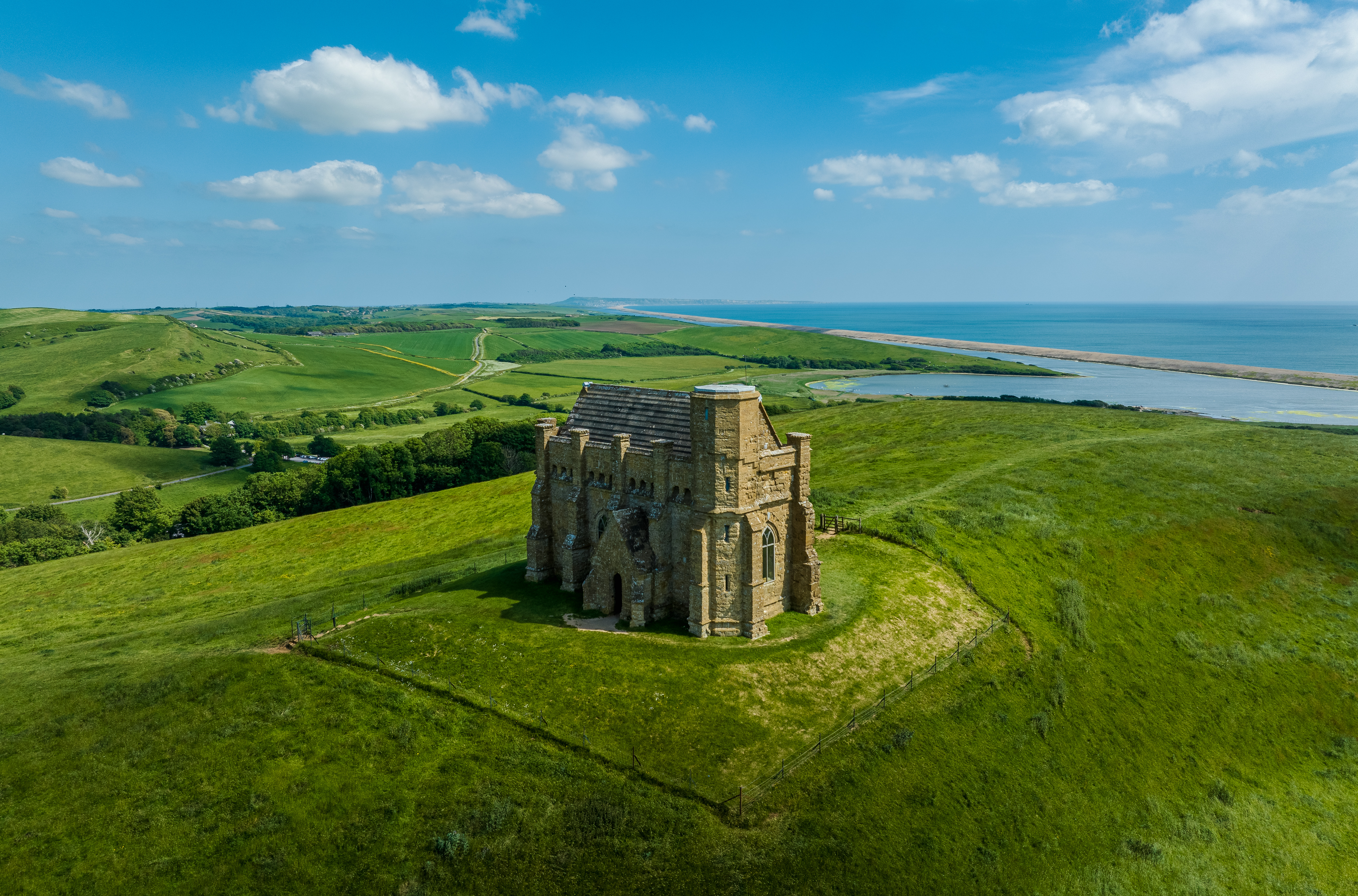
- St Catherine's Chapel

- The location of St Catherine's Chapel in Dorset, UK
- 50°39′41.47″N 02°36′23.06″W
- Location: Abbotsbury in Dorset, England

Site notes
- Owner: English Heritage

Listed Building
- Official name: Chapel of St Catherine
- Type: Grade I
- Designated: 26 January 1956
- Reference no.: 1172576

Scheduled monument
- Official name: St Catherine's Chapel, field system and quarries at Chapel Hill
- Designated: 19 December 1958
- Reference no.: 1015694

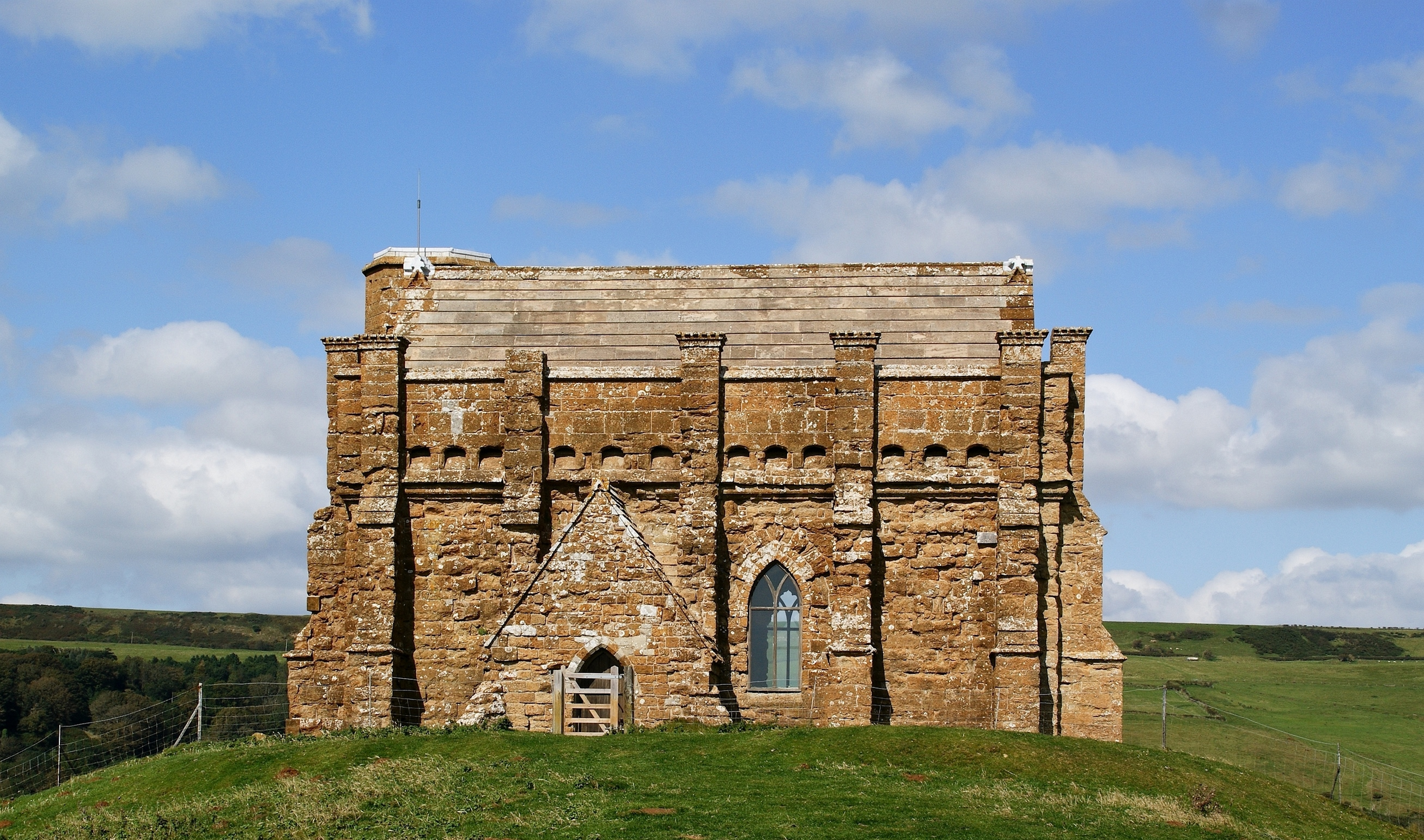
The chapel from the south

St Catherine's Chapel is a small chapel situated on a hill above the village of Abbotsbury in Dorset, England. It is dedicated to Saint Catherine. It is now in the guardianship of English Heritage and became a Grade I listed building in 1956. The chapel is also scheduled together with the field systems and quarries on the hill.

The chapel is best seen from the viewpoint on the B3157 Abbotsbury to Bridport road, with Chesil Beach in the background. The medieval strip lynchets etched into the side of the hill are known locally as the Chapel Rings.

== History ==
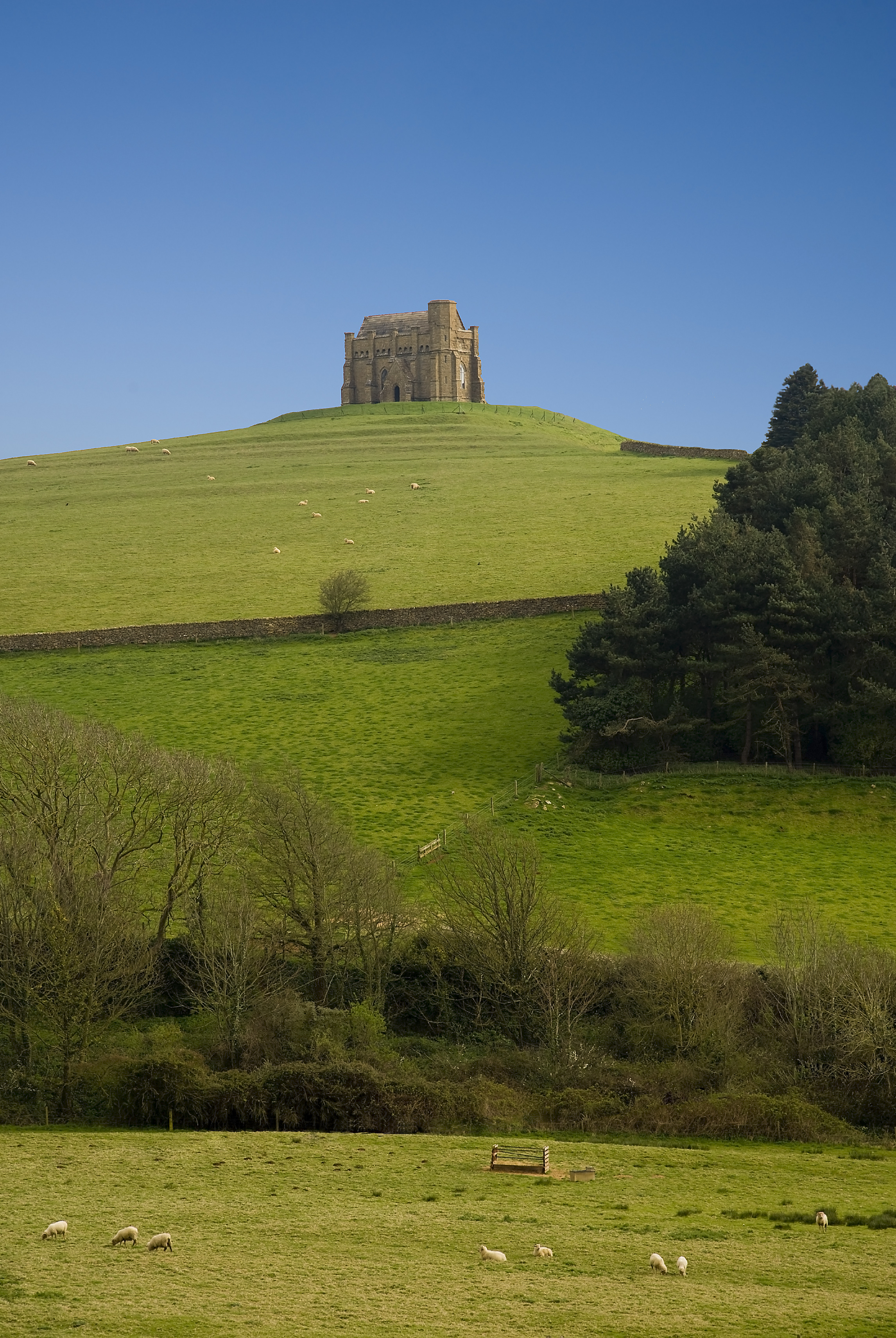
The chapel from the north

Although no records survive of the chapel's construction, the chapel has been dated in style to the late 14th century, the same time as Abbotsbury's tithe barn was built. The chapel is built on a definite platform which could have been originally for a pagan temple. St Catherine's Chapel was built as a place of pilgrimage and retreat by the monks of the nearby Benedictine monastery Abbotsbury Abbey, which the chapel overlooks high up on the hilltop. Its position on the top of a hill about 80 m (260 ft) high, overlooking the coast from Portland Bill to Bridport, meant that it was a prominent feature for seafarers. Only a handful of chapels of the same kind are located outside the precincts of the monasteries who constructed them. The isolated setting of the chapel granted the monks to withdraw from the monastery during Lent for private prayer and meditation.

In the 16th century the main abbey buildings were destroyed in the dissolution of the monasteries, but the chapel survived, most likely due to its usefulness as a coastal beacon and seamark. In later times a navigation light used to be lit at the top of the stair turret. The chapel was repaired in 1742 and the late 19th century but is largely unaltered.

Under the care of English Heritage, the chapel is open over the peak season, with free entry. Abbotsbury's local parish holds several informal services at St Catherine's Chapel during the year, usually in the latter half of the year, from June to December.

== Design ==
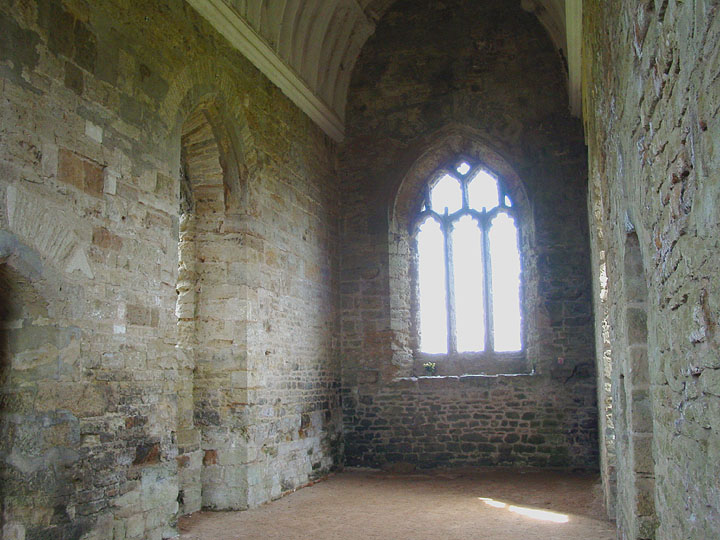
Inside the chapel, looking west

The construction of the chapel, which has a rectangular structure, is entirely of locally quarried ashlar golden buff limestone. It is notably robust in order to withstand the elements; the walls are 4-foot (1.2 m) thick and supported by stout buttresses, and the roof and even the paneled ceiling are also made of stone. The construction allows rainwater to drain off the roof through holes in the parapet wall between the buttresses. In the north-west corner is a tower. At the north-east corner a stair turret, octagonal on the outside, rises above the roof and gives access to the parapet. There is also a tiny oratory at roof level. The buttresses and the stair turret would have been originally crowned with pinnacles. A porch was constructed on both north and south walls. The stone slab roof was renewed during 1983 in Clipsham stone.

The chapel has an effect of looking far larger than it really is. The high walls and tall parapets were designed to impress, and this sense of splendour is further enhanced by the chapel's lofty position. Within the interior of the chapel, stained glass windows and details of the roof picked out in bright colours would have been the effect in medieval times. At the vaulting's intersections are bosses carved with foliage, figure subjects and animals. The chapel's main window is a large triple window on the east wall, although there are smaller windows on other walls.

== Tradition of St Catherine ==
St Catherine is the patron saint of spinsters and virgins, particularly those in search of husbands, and until the late 19th century the chapel had a local tradition where young women of Abbotsbury would 'wish', which involved using the niches provided (one for a knee and two other two holes for the hands) in the east jamb of the south doorway to 'post' prayers and make a wish to the saint asking for her help and aid. A traditional prayer used here says:

A husband, St Catherine,
A handsome one, St Catherine,
A rich one, St Catherine,
A nice one, St Catherine,
And soon, St Catherine.

In the local dialect version the request ends with the expression "Arn-a-one's better than Narn-a-one", meaning that anyone is better than 'never a one'.

The dedication of the chapel to St Catherine of Alexandria is rare, but her cult was one of the most popular in medieval England. It was St Augustine's policy that his priests, sent out from Rome around 600 AD to convert the English, should replace pagan temples with Christian churches and chapels. The early Christian missionaries would naturally try to choose a patron saint that continued, as closely as possible, the pagan dedication of the temple, and this chapel was most likely an example of that. Chapels dedicated to St Catherine are often found on hills, possibly in reference to Mount Sinai.

== In popular culture ==
The chapel appears briefly in the Powell and Pressburger film The Small Back Room.

The chapel was the inspiration behind PJ Harvey's song "The Wind", from her 1998 album Is This Desire?. PJ Harvey lives and grew up near Abbotsbury.

== See also ==
- List of English Heritage properties
