= Abbotsbury =

Village in Dorset, England

Coordinates: 50.6664°N 2.60063°W

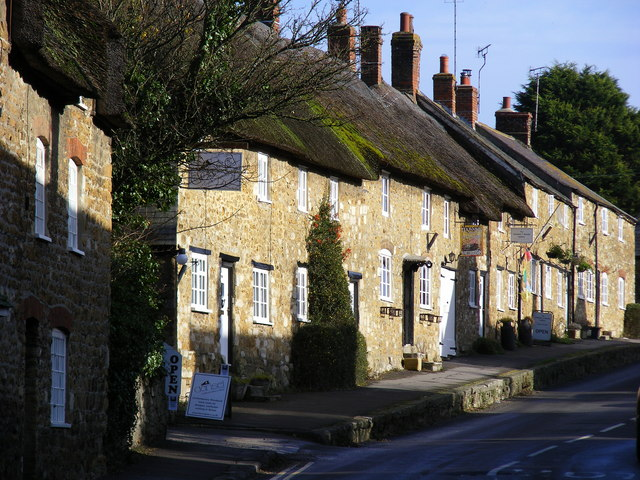
- Rodden Row, Abbotsbury

- Location within Dorset
- Population: 451
- OS grid reference: SY576853
  - London: 139 miles (224 km)
- Civil parish: Abbotsbury
- Unitary authority: Dorset
- Ceremonial county: Dorset
- Region: South West
- Country: England
- Sovereign state: United Kingdom
- Post town: WEYMOUTH
- Postcode district: DT3
- Dialling code: 01305
- Police: Dorset
- Fire: Dorset and Wiltshire
- Ambulance: South Western
- UK Parliament: West Dorset
- Website: http://www.abbotsbury.co.uk/

Abbotsbury is a village and civil parish in the English county of Dorset. The village is located around 7 1/2 miles (12 km) west southwest of Dorchester and 1 mile (1.6 km) inland from the English Channel coast. In the 2021 census the civil parish had a population of 451.

Abbotsbury has been described as a tourism honeypot, known for its picturesque historic buildings and thatched cottages, its variety of tourist attractions, and as a gateway to the Jurassic Coast World Heritage Site and Dorset National Landscape. Abbotsbury is known for its swannery, subtropical gardens and surviving abbey buildings, including St Catherine's Chapel, a 14th-century pilgrimage chapel that stands on a hill between the village and the coast. The coastline within the parish includes a section of Chesil Beach, and the South West Coast Path and Macmillan Way long-distance footpaths pass through the village.

The Ilchester Estate owns much of the village, including the swannery and subtropical gardens. The estate owns 61 square kilometres (15,000 acres) of land in Dorset.

== Geography ==
Abbotsbury village is in the Dorset unitary authority administrative area, situated about 1 mile (1.6 km) inland from the English Channel coast at Chesil Beach, an 18-mile (29 km) barrier beach which south of the village encloses The Fleet, a brackish coastal lagoon. The Dorset Downs, an area of rolling chalk hills, rise steeply to the north the village.

Measured directly, the village is about 7 miles (11 km) northwest of Weymouth and 8 miles (13 km) southeast of Bridport. Abbotsbury is connected to those towns by the B3157, which is the main road running through the village. Abbotsbury is located 6 miles (10 km) from Upwey railway station and 35 miles (56 km) from Bournemouth Airport. The coastline within Abbotsbury civil parish is part of the Jurassic Coast, a World Heritage Site. All of Abbotsbury parish is within the Dorset Area of Outstanding Natural Beauty.

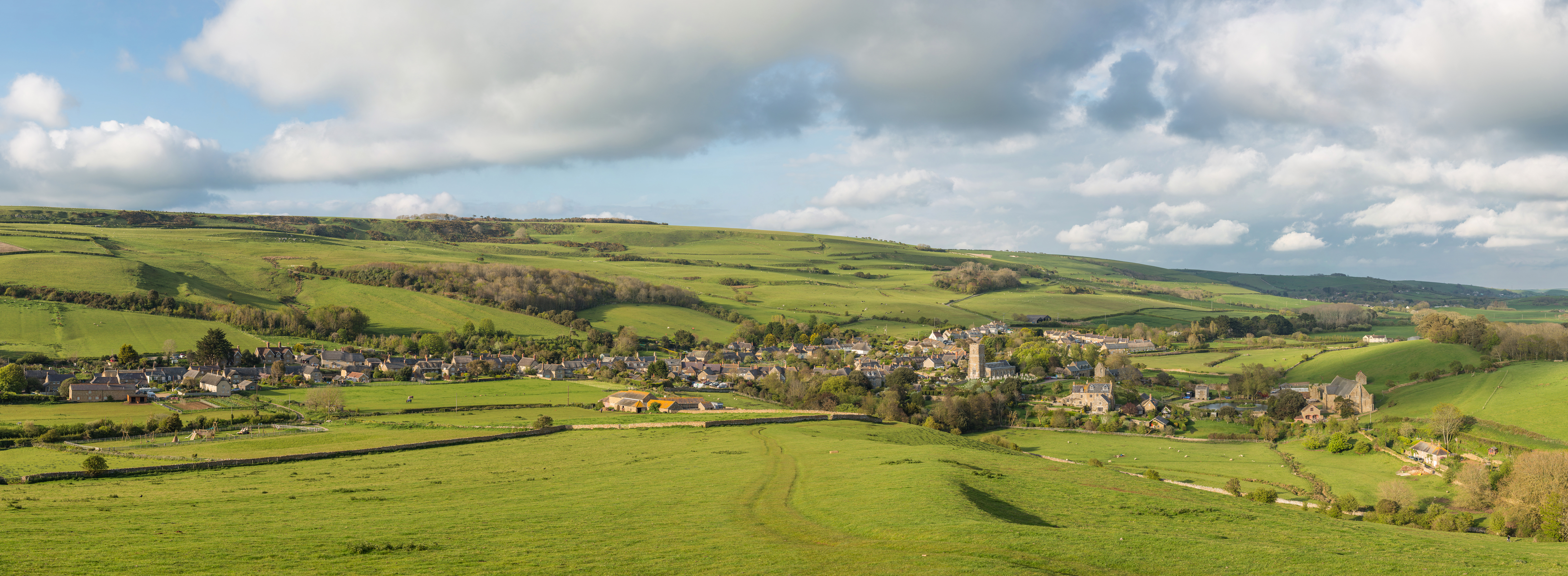
Panorama of the village of Abbotsbury as viewed from the south-west at St Catherine's Chapel

== History ==
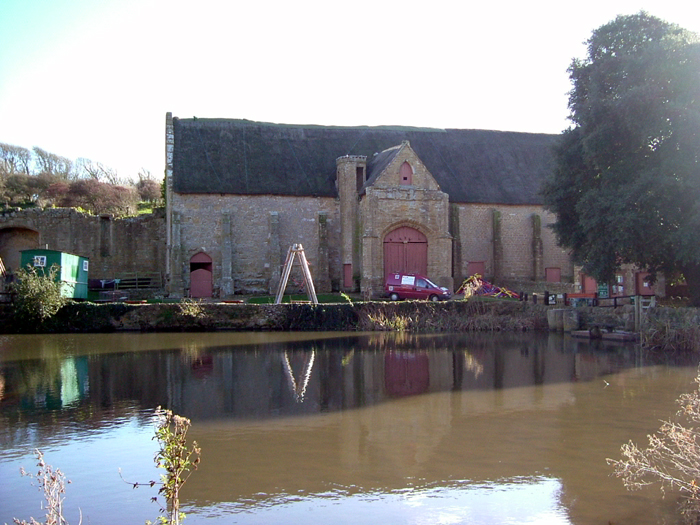
Abbotsbury Abbey tithe barn

One and a half miles (2.4 km) northwest of the village, at the top of Wears Hill, are the earthworks of Abbotsbury Castle, an Iron Age hill fort. The earthworks cover a roughly triangular area of about 10 acres (4.0 ha), of which about 4.5 acres (1.8 ha) are inside the ramparts.

In the 10th century a charter of King Edmund records a granting of land at Abbedesburi, a name which indicates the land may have once belonged to an abbot. In the 11th century King Cnut granted land at nearby Portesham to the Scandinavian thegn Orc (also Urki, Urk), who took up residence in the area with his wife Tola. The couple founded Abbotsbury Abbey and enriched it with a substantial amount of land. Orc is also responsible for the oldest surviving guild charter in England where he presented a guildhall to the gyldschipe of Abbotsbury, with the members associated in almsgiving, caring for their sick, burial of the dead, and providing Masses for the souls of deceased members. There was also an annual feast.

In 1086, in the Domesday Book Abbotsbury was recorded as Abedesberie or Abodesberie; it had 62 households, 16 ploughlands, 32 acres (13 ha) of meadow and 2 mills. It was in the hundred of Uggescombe and the lords and tenants-in-chief were Abbotsbury Abbey and Hawise, wife of Hugh son of Grip.

Abbotsbury Abbey existed for 500 years, but was destroyed in the dissolution, although the abbey barn survived. Stone from the abbey was used in the construction of many buildings in the village, including the house of Abbotsbury's new owner, Sir Giles Strangways.

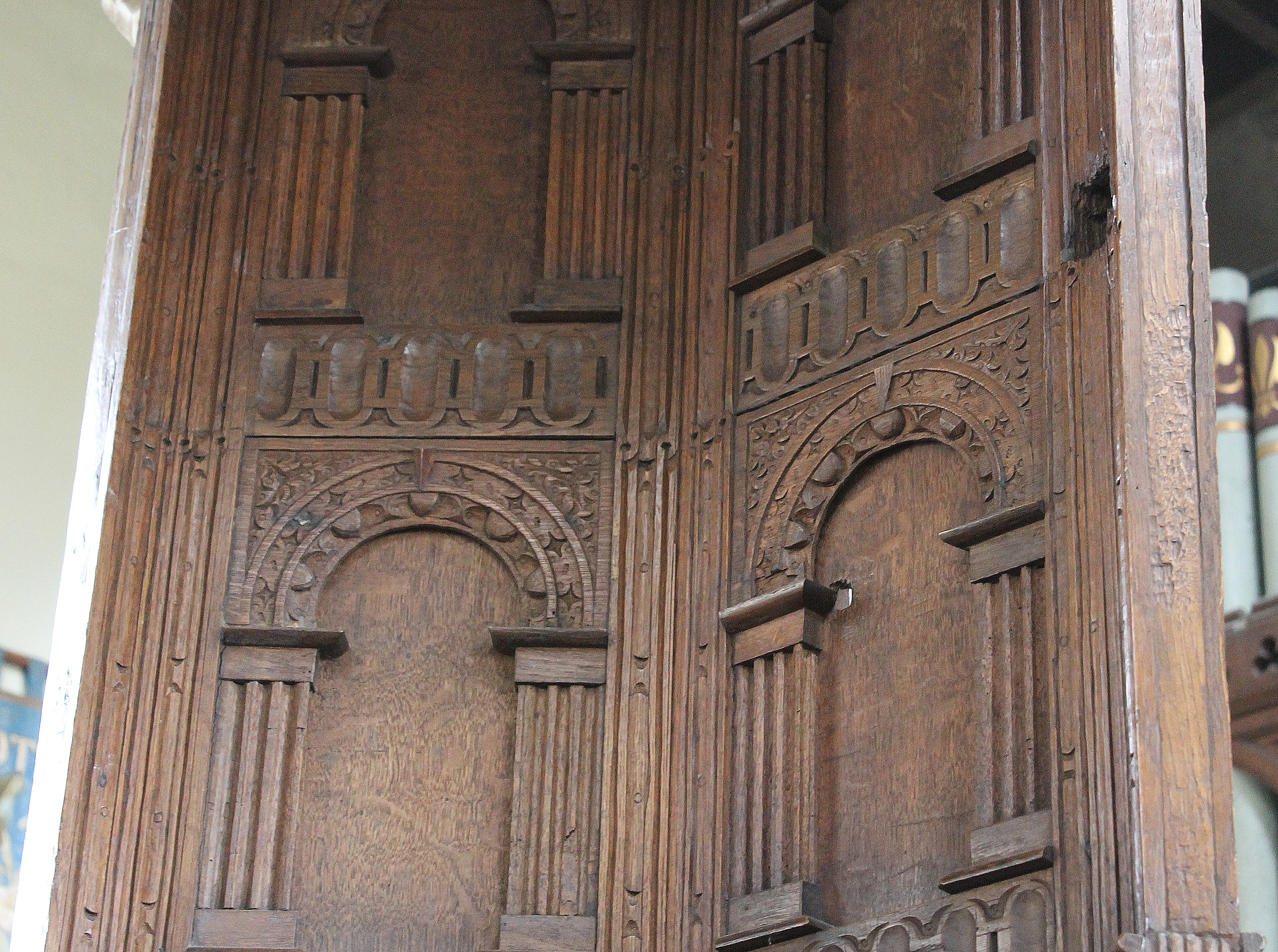
The parish church's Jacobean pulpit, showing damage from the Civil War skirmish (bullet holes on right)

In 1644, during the English Civil War, Roundheads (Parliamentarians) and Cavaliers (Royalists) clashed at Abbotsbury. Parliamentarians besieged the Royalists in the church of St. Nicholas; two bullet holes from the fight remain in the Jacobean pulpit. The Strangways house which had replaced the Abbey after the dissolution was also the scene of a skirmish, as the Royalist Colonel Strangways resisted the Parliamentarians, who besieged the house and burned it. The house gunpowder store exploded in the fire and the house was destroyed, together with the old abbey records which had been stored there.

In the late 17th, and early 18th centuries Abbotsbury experienced several fires, resulting in the destruction of virtually all its medieval buildings. Most of the historic secular buildings in the village today were built from stone in the 17th and 18th centuries.

County historian John Hutchins (1698–1773) recorded that fishing was the main industry in the village, and 18th-century militia ballot lists reveal that husbandry was also particularly important. Ropemaking, basketry and the manufacture of cotton stockings were other notable trades within the village, with records indicating hemp and withies being grown in the area.

In the early 19th century, Abbotsbury's population grew steadily, from about 800 in 1801 to nearly 1,100 sixty years later.

During the Second World War, the coastal front was fortified and defended as a part of British anti-invasion preparations of World War II. Later, The Fleet Lagoon was used as a machine gun training range, and bouncing bombs were tested there, for Operation Chastise (the "Dambuster" sortie).

The modern village still has a long street of stone houses, many of which are thatched, with some dating from the 16th century. The street broadens at one point into an old market square. Parts of the street have a raised pavement. The village is surrounded by hills on all sides, except to the east; in 1905 Sir Frederick Treves described Abbotsbury as being "very pleasantly situated among the downs". Dorset-born broadcaster and writer Ralph Wightman described the village as "possibly the most interesting in Dorset".

Abbotsbury was the location for a small Royal Observer Corps Bunker, it was located near to Abbotsbury Hill. It was opened in 1959 and closed in 1968, it remains mostly intact.

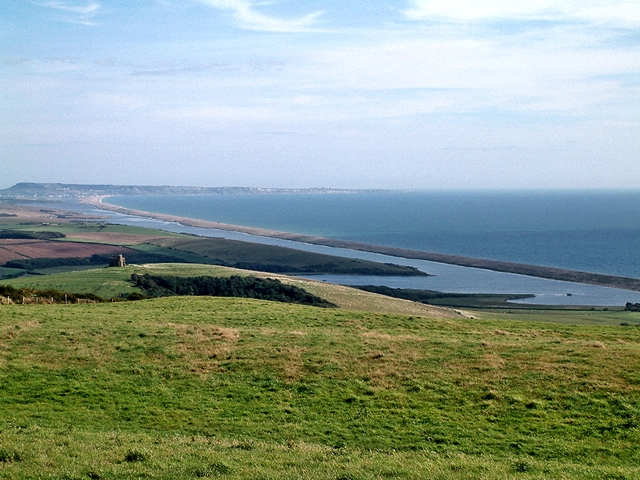
Chesil Beach and The Fleet from the northwest, with St Catherine's Chapel on the left

== Governance ==
In the United Kingdom national parliament, Abbotsbury is in the West Dorset parliamentary constituency.

In local government, Abbotsbury is in the Dorset unitary authority area at the highest tier, and Chesil Bank civil parish (which also includes Portesham, Fleet and Langton Herring) at the lowest tier. Abbotsbury elects four of the 15 councillors on Chesil Bank Parish Council. For elections to Dorset Council, it is part of Chesil Bank electoral ward.

Historically, Abbotsbury was in Weymouth Rural District from 1894 to 1933, Dorchester Rural District from 1933 to 1974, and the West Dorset district from 1974 to 2019.

== Demography ==
In the 2011 census, the civil parish—which includes the hamlet of Rodden to the east—had 256 dwellings, 219 households and a population of 481. 23.3% of residents were age 65 or over, compared to 16.4% for England as a whole.

Census population of Abbotsbury parish 1921–2021
Census	1921	1931	1951	1961	1971	1981	1991	2001	2011	2021
Population	*643	*562	*532	470	430	390	410	500	481	451
Asterisks (*) indicate a boundary change No UK census took place in 1941

=== Notable people ===
Scientist James Lovelock, best known for proposing the Gaia hypothesis, lived in Abbotsbury in his later years.

Judge Sir David Neuberger took as his Life Peerage title Baron Neuberger of Abbotsbury in 2007.

== Transport ==
The B3157, known locally as "the coast road", between Abbotsbury and Burton Bradstock is noted for its fine coastal views and often promoted as a scenic route for tourists. To the west of the village, the road climbs Abbotsbury Hill, a 200 metres (660 ft) climb with up to 20% gradient that is noted as a popular challenge for cyclists.

Abbotsbury is served by the First Hampshire & Dorset Jurassic Coaster branded bus services X52 (summer only) and X53 which provide connections to Axminster, Lyme Regis, Bridport, Weymouth, Lulworth Cove and Wool.

Between 1885 and 1952, Abbotsbury was served by the Abbotsbury Railway, a 6 miles (10 km) branch from the main line to Weymouth. It was primarily designed for freight, in anticipation of the development of oil shale deposits and stone at Portesham, as well as iron ore at Abbotsbury which would be shipped to South Wales for processing. The Abbotsbury terminus of the line was sited to the east of the village because the railway could not buy the land needed to build the station closer to the centre of the village.

== Notable buildings ==
Nearly a hundred structures within the parish are listed by English Heritage for their historic or architectural interest. These include six structures listed as Grade I and six listed as Grade II*.

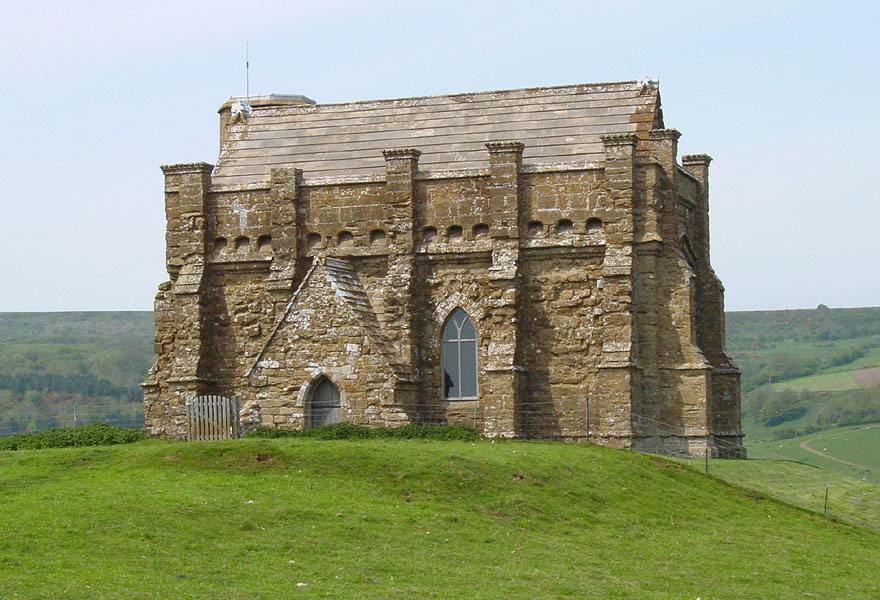
St Catherine's Chapel

To the south of the village, on a bare hill about 80 metres (260 ft) high, stands St Catherine's Chapel, a small 14th-century pilgrimage chapel used by the monks of the abbey as a place for private prayer. It is built entirely of stone, including the roof and even the panelled ceiling. The walls are 1.2 metres (3.9 feet) thick and buttressed. The chapel overlooks the English Channel, and may have served as a beacon for sailors, warning of the nearby Isle of Portland. The chapel is listed as Grade I.

The Parish Church of St Nicholas dates from the 14th century but has had various revisions over the centuries. The tower contains three bells dating from 1773 and made by Thomas Castleman Bilbie of the Bilbie family in Cullompton. The chancel was classicised in the 18th century and still has its plastered barrel roof and fine altarpiece. There are also some 15th-century painted glass, a stone effigy of one of the abbots and a Jacobean canopied pulpit. The church is listed as Grade I.

Abbotsbury Abbey tithe barn was built around 1400. It measures 83 by 9.5 metres (272 by 31 ft) and is the world's largest thatched tithe barn. It has 23 bays, 11 of which have been unroofed since the 17th century. The 12 roofed bays are covered with thatch, though previously stone slabs were used. Part of the north wall has been destroyed. The barn is listed as Grade I.

== Ilchester Estate ==
An estate of some 61 square kilometres (15,000 acres) in Dorset covering Chesil Beach and Abbotsbury is held by the Ilchester Estate, owned by Mrs Charlotte Townshend, the daughter of Viscount Galway, a descendant of the first Countess of Ilchester and owner of the Melbury Estate.

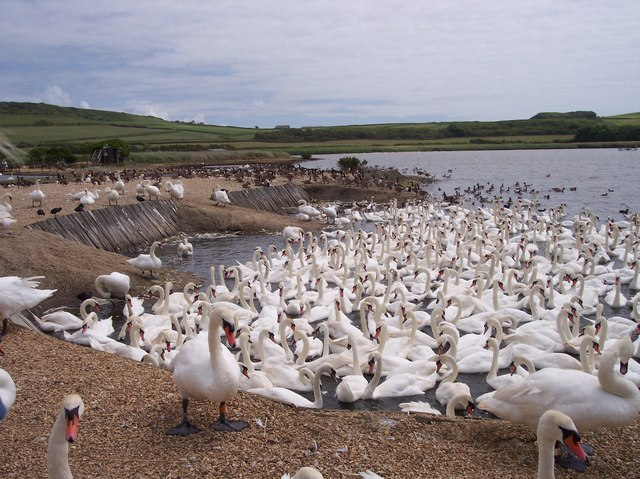
Mute swans on the Fleet lagoon at Abbotsbury Swannery

=== Swannery ===
Situated south of the village on the shore of the Fleet lagoon, Abbotsbury Swannery is over 600 years old, having previously been owned by the abbot and managed, using decoys, to provide meat for the abbey. When the abbey was destroyed the swannery passed to the earls of Ilchester, and today the decoys are used for monitoring and recording purposes. The swannery has a large colony of mute swans, as well as other waterfowl, and is open to the public. The site is an important nesting and breeding ground for the swans and, from May through the summer, cygnets can be seen at close quarters.

=== Subtropical gardens ===
Abbotsbury Subtropical Gardens were founded in 1765 by the Countess of Ilchester, as a kitchen garden for the nearby castle. Since then, the gardens have developed into a 20-acre (81,000 m^{2}) site filled with exotic plants, many of which were newly discovered species when they were first introduced. There are formal and informal gardens, with woodland walks and walled gardens. In 1990 violent storms damaged many of the rare specimens, which have since been replaced by younger plants.

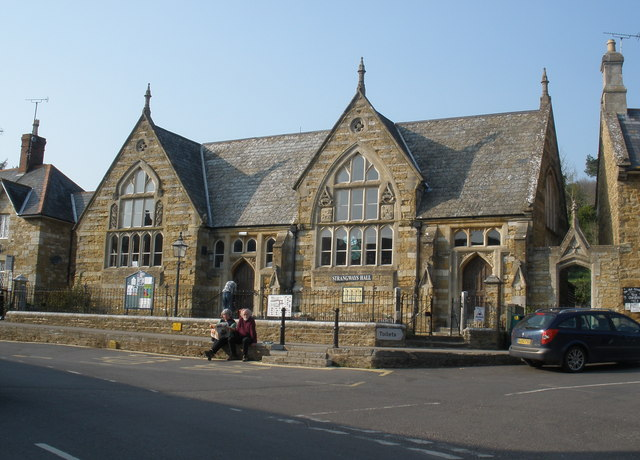
Strangways Village Hall

== Amenities ==
Abbotsbury has a village hall, called the Strangways Village Hall; it is run by the Strangways Hall Committee and is a registered charity and available for hire. The village has two public houses, The Ilchester Arms and The Swan Inn, and several tearooms, small shops and businesses. The village also has a cricket ground.

== Abbotsbury Garland Day ==
Held on 13 May each year, Abbotsbury Garland Day has been celebrated since about the early 19th century. The custom was first described in John Hutchins' History of Dorset in 1867. Originally, the children of the local fishermen made garlands which were blessed in a church service and some were then rowed out to sea to be tossed into the water. The children would then spend the rest of the day playing on the beach.

After World War I, the custom evolved and children of non-fishermen started to take part, probably due to the decline of the local fishing industry. The village school gave the children a day's holiday and they would construct two garlands, one of wild flowers and the other of garden flowers. These were held aloft on poles and paraded from house to house in the village with the intention of collecting money which the children would keep. Later in the day, older children who had been at school in Weymouth would arrive home and make a more elaborate garland which would also be taken around the houses. Two garlands would be placed on the war memorial.

Abbotsbury village school closed in 1981 and the children no longer get a holiday, so the celebrations now usually take place in the evening or on the nearest Saturday.
