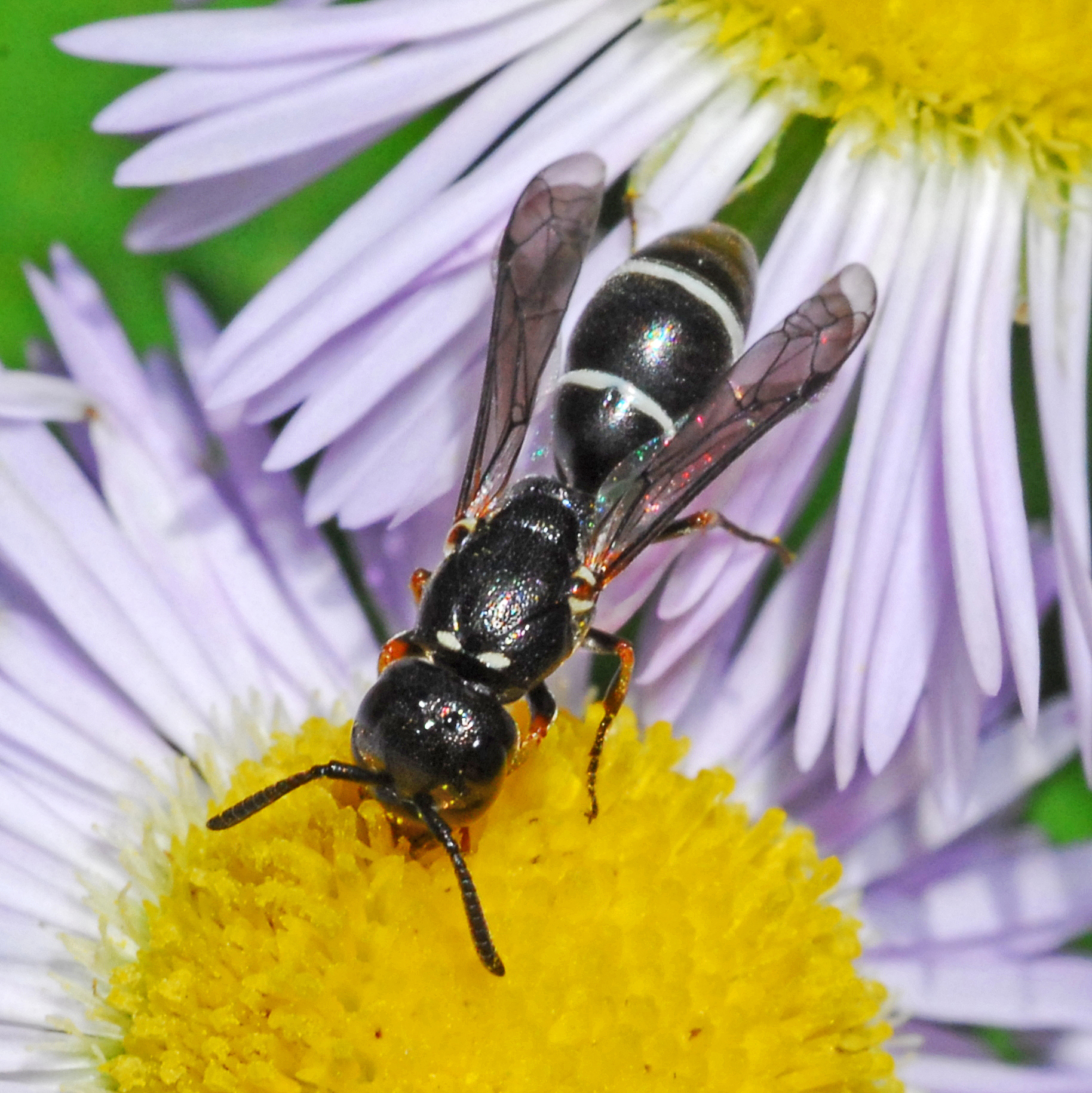
- Microdynerus species

Scientific classification
- Domain: Eukaryota
- Kingdom: Animalia
- Phylum: Arthropoda
- Class: Insecta
- Order: Hymenoptera
- Family: Vespidae
- Subfamily: Eumeninae
- Genus: Microdynerus; Thomson 1874

Type species
- Odynerus exilis Herrich-Schaeffer, 1839

Species
- See text

= Microdynerus =

Genus of wasps

Microdynerus is a genus of potter wasps in the family Vespidae.

== Distribution ==
These wasps are present in southeast Asia, North America, Europe, Africa and in the Near East.

== Species ==
Sources:

- Microdynerus abdelkader (Saussure, 1856)
- Microdynerus aegaeicus Gusenleitner, 1998
- Microdynerus alastoroides Morawitz, 1885
- Microdynerus anatolicus (Blüthgen, 1938)
- Microdynerus appenninicus Giordani Soika, 1958
- Microdynerus arenicolus – Antioch potter wasp (Bohart, 1955)
- Microdynerus atriceps Morawitz, 1895
- Microdynerus bechteli (Bohart, 1955)
- Microdynerus bolingeri Parker, 1970
- Microdynerus cavatus (Bohart, 1955)
- Microdynerus confinis Gusenleitner, 1979
- Microdynerus curdistanicus Gusenleitner, 1988
- Microdynerus erzincanensis Yilderim & Özbeck, 1995
- Microdynerus eurasius (Blüthgen, 1938)
- Microdynerus exilis Herrich-Schäffer, 1839
- Microdynerus gibboceps (Bohart, 1955)
- Microdynerus habitus Gusenleitner, 1991
- Microdynerus hannibal (Saussure, 1856)
- Microdynerus hoetzendorfi (Dusmet, 1917)
- Microdynerus hurdi Parker, 1970
- Microdynerus insulanus Gusenleitner, 1998
- Microdynerus interruptus Gusenleitner, 1970
- Microdynerus inusitatus Parker, 1970
- Microdynerus laticlypeus Giordani Soika, 1971
- Microdynerus latro Blüthgen, 1955
- Microdynerus lissosomus (Bohart, 1940)
- Microdynerus longicollis Morawitz, 1895
- Microdynerus ludendorffi (Dusmet, 1917)
- Microdynerus microdynerus (Dalla Torre, 1889)
- Microdynerus mirandus (Giordani Soika, 1947)
- Microdynerus monolobus (Bohart, 1951)
- Microdynerus nitidus Gusenleitner, 1991
- Microdynerus nugdunensis (Saussure, 1856)
- Microdynerus parvulus (Herrich-Schäffer, 1838)
- Microdynerus patagoniae Parker, 1970
- Microdynerus perezi (Berland, 1927)
- Microdynerus robustus (Dusmet, 1903)
- Microdynerus rubescens Gusenleitner, 1973
- Microdynerus rubiculus Gusenleitner, 2000
- Microdynerus rubronotatus (Kostylev, 1940)
- Microdynerus rufus Giordani Soika, 1971
- Microdynerus saundersi Blüthgen, 1955
- Microdynerus sayi (Cameron, 1908)
- Microdynerus singulus (Bohart, 1955)
- Microdynerus syriacus Gusenleitner, 2000
- Microdynerus tauromenitanus Blüthgen, 1955
- Microdynerus timidus (Saussure, 1856)
- Microdynerus tridentatus Kostylev, 1934
- Microdynerus trinodus (Bohart, 1955)
