= Abbotsbury Abbey =

Benedictine abbey in Dorset, England

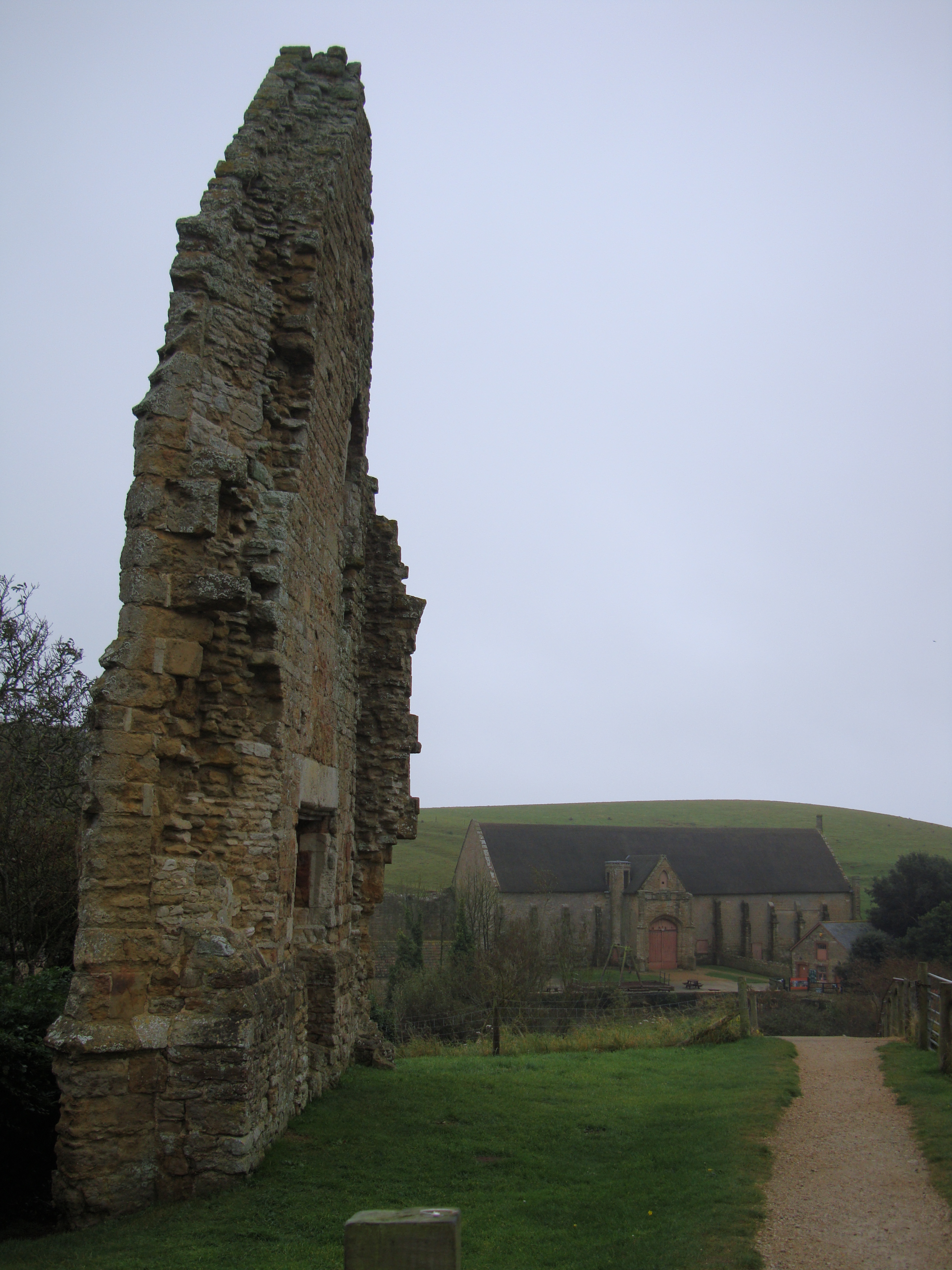
- Abbotsbury Abbey remains and the abbey barn

- Location within Dorset

Monastery information
- Order: Benedictines
- Established: 11th century
- Disestablished: 1539
- Dedication: St Peter

Site
- Location: Abbotsbury, England
- Coordinates: 50°39′52.1″N 2°35′55.4″W
- Visible remains: tithe barn, parts of a building (possibly the abbot's house)
- Public access: yes

Abbotsbury Abbey, dedicated to Saint Peter, was a Benedictine monastery in the village of Abbotsbury in Dorset, England. The abbey was founded in the 11th century by King Cnut's thegn Orc and his wife Tola, who handsomely endowed the monastery with lands in the area. The abbey prospered and became a local centre of power, controlling eight manor houses and villages. During the later Middle Ages, the abbey suffered much misfortune. In the time of the dissolution of the monasteries, the last abbot surrendered the abbey and the site became the property of Sir Giles Strangways.

Today, a small part of the former Abbey estate, including the abbey's remains, and those of the nearby St Catherine's Chapel, are in the guardianship of English Heritage.

== History ==
=== Foundation ===
The first reference to the site of Abbotsbury may be in a charter of King Edmund (r. 939–946) recording a grant of five hides of land at Abbedesburi to the thegn Sigewulf. The name (Abbedesburi) may suggest that the land had once belonged to an abbot. During the reign of King Cnut (r. 1016–1035), the Scandinavian thegn Orc (also Urki, Urk) and his wife Tola took up residence in the area, having been granted land at Portesham. Edward the Confessor (r. 1042–1066) also granted him Wootton and it was early in his reign that the couple founded a monastery at Abbotsbury, previously the site of a minor church. Orc and Tola, who had no children, enriched the monastery with a substantial amount of land, some of which was bequeathed after their deaths. By the time of the Domesday survey, Abbotsbury (itself worth 21 hides) was recorded to have held more than 65 hides of land TRE. Orc also established his own guild, which according to the extant statutes, had its hall at Abbotsbury and protected the minster's interests.

=== Last period and dissolution ===
During the 14th century the Black Death killed many villagers and also the abbot. Moreover, the village was repeatedly attacked from the sea, reducing the security of the abbey and its status. In addition, the area suffered depredations from the forces sent to man the coastal defences. Later that century and in the century following the Abbey's situation had started to improve somewhat. In 1535 and 1539 Henry VIII undertook the forcible Dissolution of the Monasteries. Under the last Abbot of Abbotsbury, Roger Roddon, the Abbey was dissolved in 1539, following a visit from Dr. Thomas Legh (Leigh, Lee).

Upon the surrender of the abbey, on 12 March 1539, Abbot Roger Roddon, along with the prior and eight brethren received pensions: the abbot, £80; the prior, Thomas Bradford, £9; Thomas Tolpuddle, £7; six other brethren, including William Grey and John Vynsant, £6 to £5 each; Thomas Holnest, 40s. Sir Giles Strangways (died 1546), the commissioner who had dissolved the monastery and who bought the abbey buildings, manor houses, water mills and Abbotsbury Swannery and much of the abbey's land for £1,906, 10s (equivalent to £1,600,000 in 2025). On the one hand Strangways' own father had in fact been buried in the Abbey, and when he himself died in 1546 his will bequeathed £6 13s.4d. a year for two years for a priest to say Mass for the repose of his soul and the souls of his wife and son.

Henry VIII granted the abbey site to Sir Giles Strangways. Much of the land still belongs to Strangways' descendants, the Earls of Ilchester.

=== Known Abbots of Abbotsbury ===
The Abbot of Abbotsbury
- Shield: Azure three sets of two keys addorsed paleways bows interlaced wards in chief.

Incumbent	In office	Comments
Æsuuerdus	?	appears in 1075
[ Roger, bishop of Salisbury ]	1107–1139	
Geoffrey	1140	
Roger	?	appears in 1129 x 1150.
Geoffrey II	?	appears in 1166.
vacant	1175, 1–8 July	
Ralph?	?	
Roger II	?	appears in 1201.
Hugh	?	appears in 1204 x 1205.
vacant	1213, 15 July	
Hugh II	? – 1246?	
Roger de Brideton	1246–1258?	
Joan of Hilton (Helton)	1258–1284	
Philip of Sherborne	1284–1296	
[William of Kingston]		
Benedict of Loders (Lodres)	1297–1320	
Ralph of Sherborne	1320–1321	
Peter of Sherborne	1321–1324	
William le Fauconer	1324–1343	
Walter de Saunford	1343–1348	
Walter de Stokes	1348–1354	
Henry (of) Toller (or Tolre)	1354–1376	
William Cerne	1376–1401	
Robert Bylsay	1401–1426	
Richard Percy	1426–1442	resigned in 1442
Edward Watton	1442–1452	
William Wuller	1452–1468	
Hugh Dorchester	1468–1496	
John Abbotsbury	1496 (elected)	
John Portesham	1505 (elected)	
Roger Roddon	1534–1539	last abbot, surrendered.

=== Burials ===
- Humphrey Stafford (died 1413) and wife Elizabeth d'Aumale Mautravers Stafford
- Sir John Mautravers
- Humphrey Stafford (died 1442)

== Architecture and historic listing designations ==
As was customary in such cases, Abbotsbury Abbey was largely demolished to maximize profit from the sale and to allow its stone to be reused.

The 14th century Tithe Barn, which at 272 ft by 31 ft is reputedly the largest thatched tithe barn in the world, was spared. Though now only half roofed, the still impressive structure has two porches, each surmounted by a watching chamber. Also spared from the general destruction was St Catherine's Chapel, used at one time as a lookout across the sea and conversely as a landmark for mariners. Both are currently Grade I listed buildings and scheduled monuments. In the churchyard to the south of the present parish church, traces of the north wall of the abbey are visible. These remnants are also listed at Grade I. Other Grade I listed buildings at the site include the Malthouse, and the Dairy House. There are four structures listed at Grade II*; the Pigeon House, a gable end section of wall called Pynion's End, a gatehouse, and a run of cottages, the Abbott's Walk. Grade II buildings include a gateway, Abbey House, and a Granary. The Abbey's former swannery is an internationally famous nature reserve.

== Gallery ==
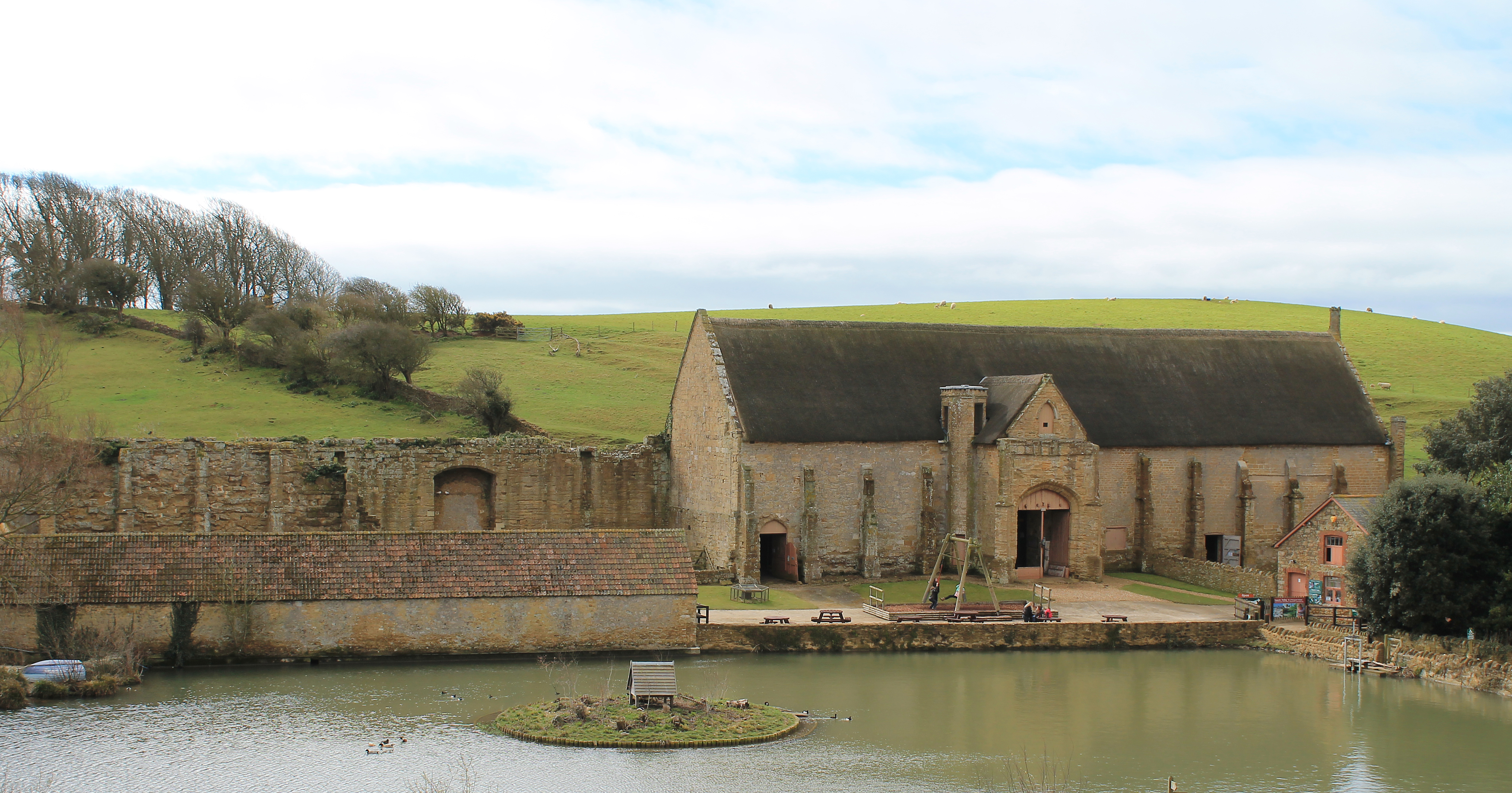
The Grade I listed Tithe Barn

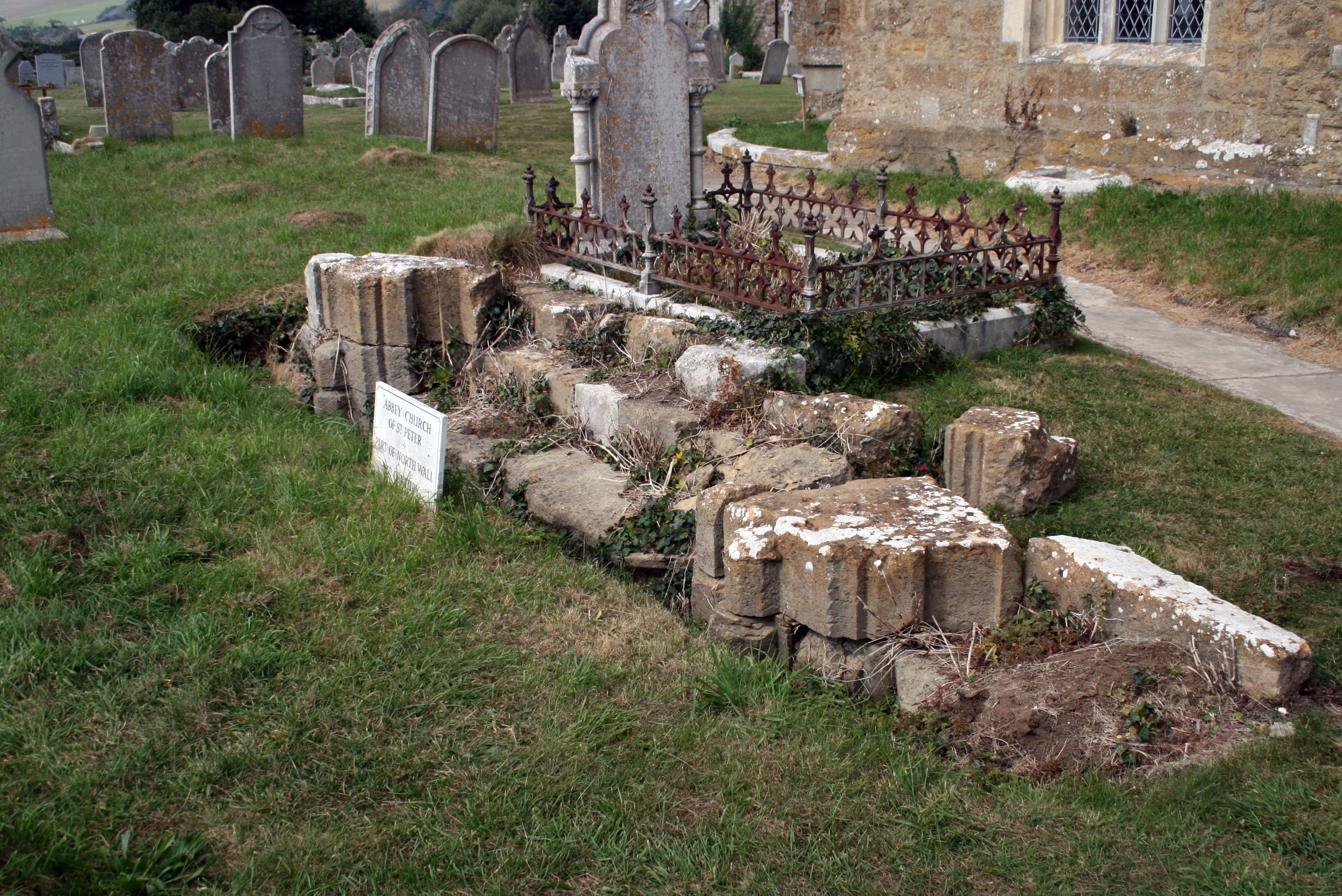
Fragments of the Grade I listed abbey North Wall

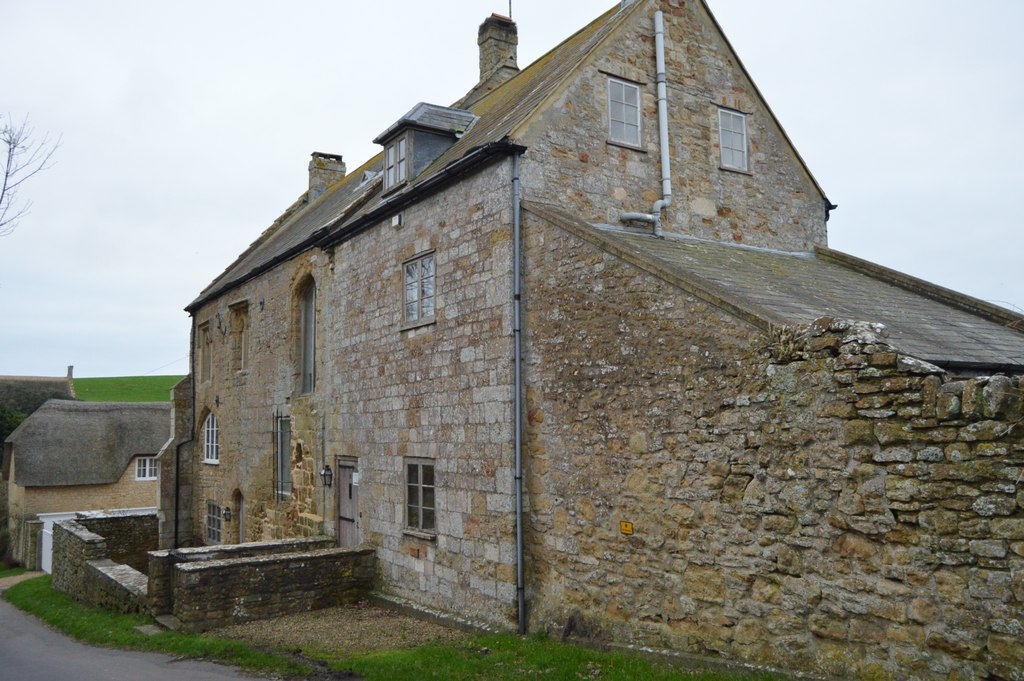
The Grade I listed Dairy House

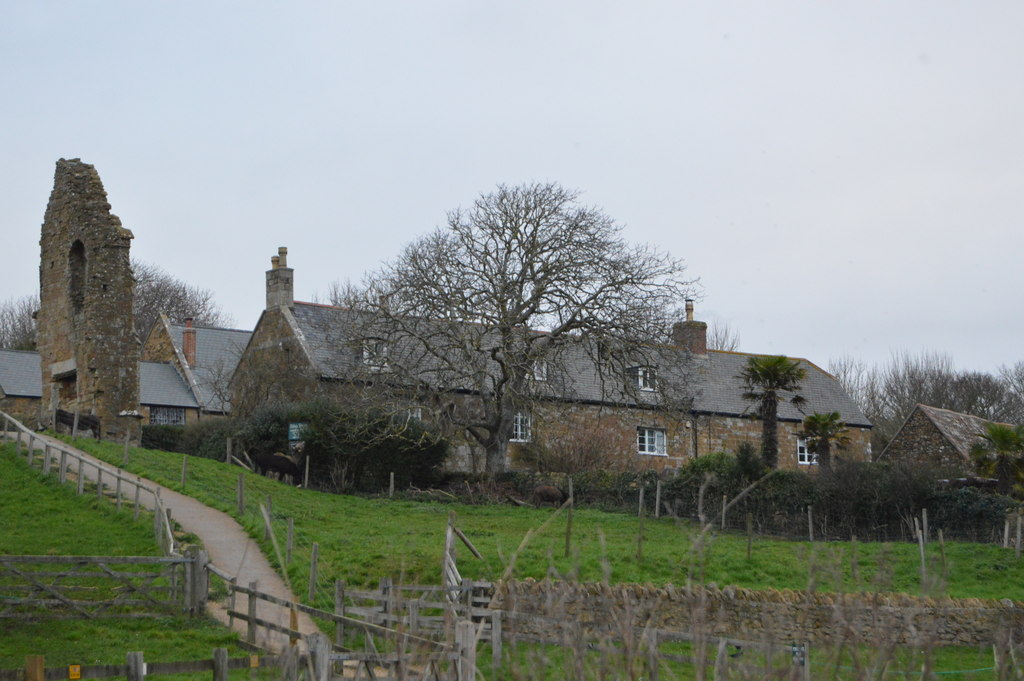
The Grade II listed Abbey House, with the gable of the Grade I listed Malthouse on the extreme right

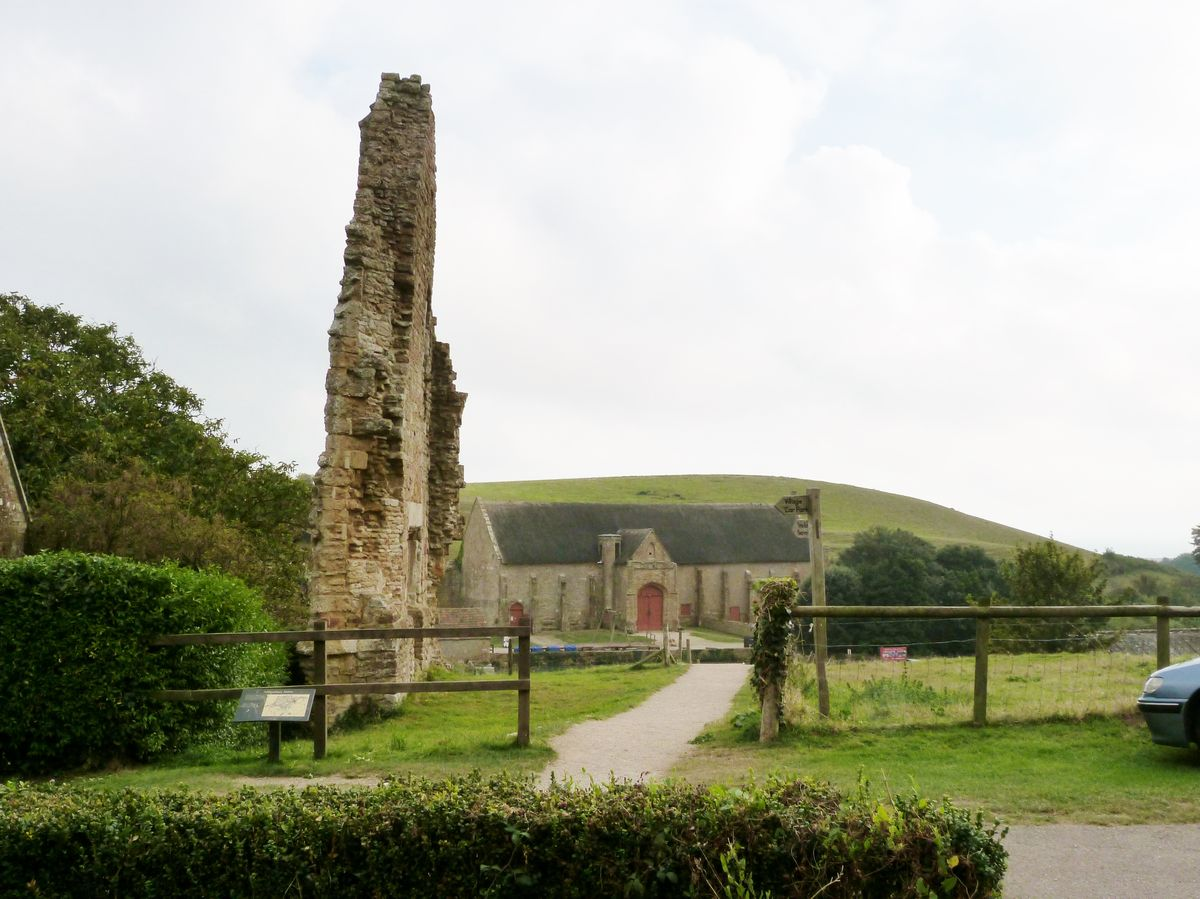
The Grade II* listed Pynion End gable, with the tithe barn beyond

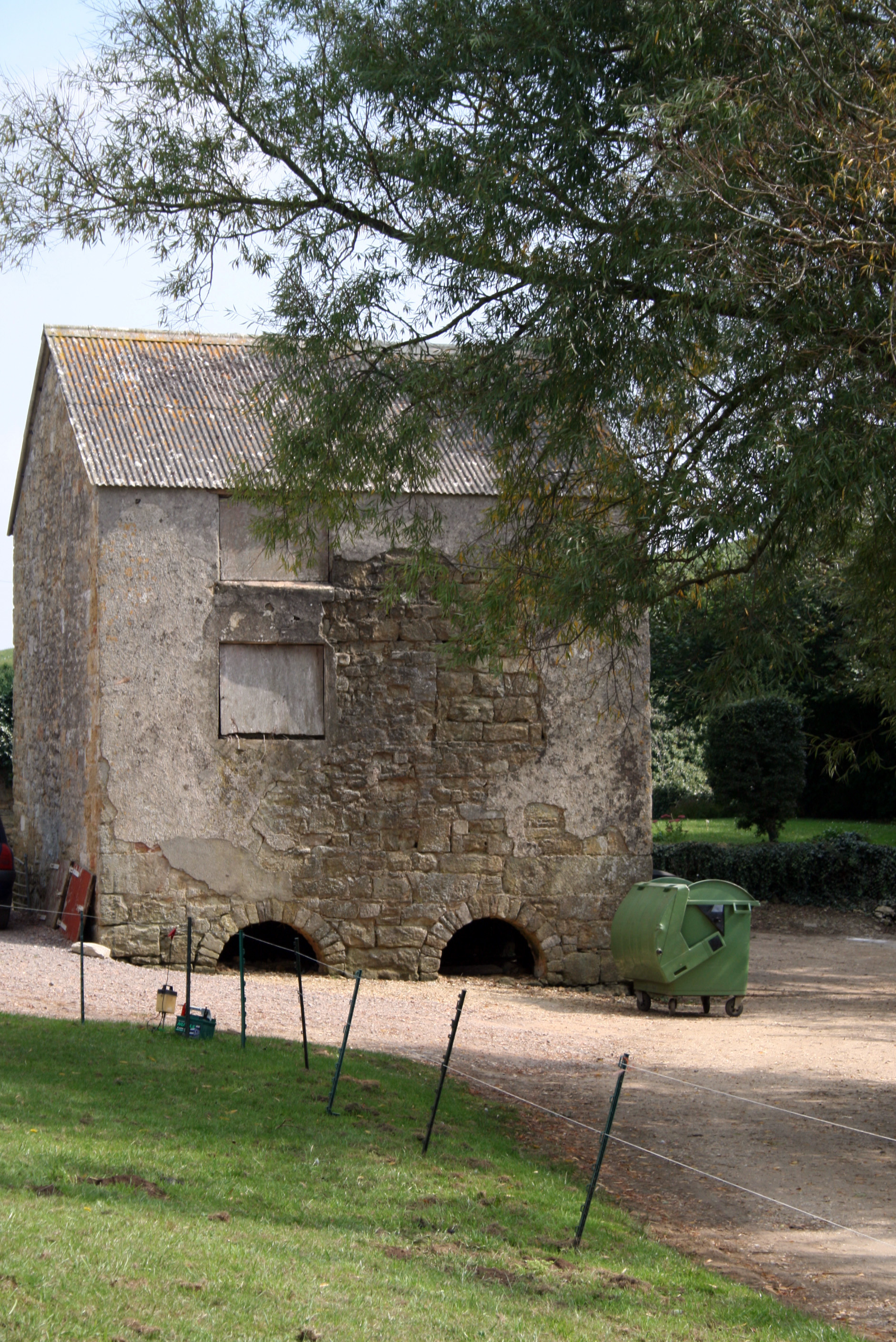
The Grade II listed Granary

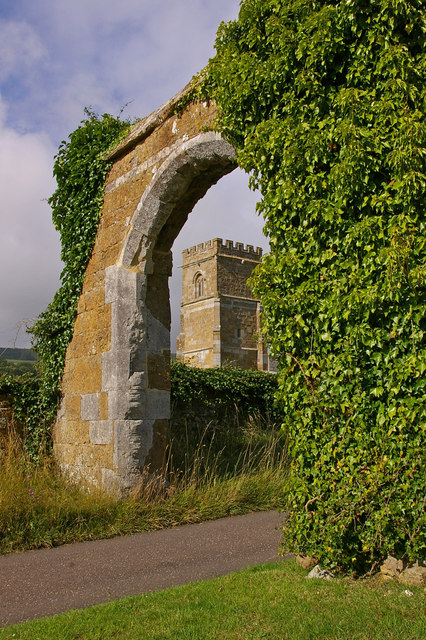
The Grade II listed gateway
