= Abbotsbury Railway =

Disused railway line in Dorset, England

The Abbotsbury Railway was a standard gauge railway line which ran in the west of the county of Dorset in England opening in 1885. Although great hopes of mineral traffic drove the original construction of the line, these failed to materialise and after a quiet existence carrying local passengers and agricultural produce, the line closed in 1952.

== Planning and construction ==
=== First railways to Dorchester and Weymouth ===
The Southampton and Dorchester Railway opened its line to Dorchester on 1 June 1847. The company was friendly to the London and South Western Railway (LSWR) so Dorchester had a direct connection to London over that line. At the time there was intense rivalry between the LSWR and its allies, and the Great Western Railway (GWR) and its associated companies. Because the track gauges of the two groups were different, the competition was characterised as the gauge wars; the GWR used the broad gauge and the LSWR used the narrow gauge, which later became known as standard gauge.

The Southampton and Dorchester line had been planned as the first stage of a line via Bridport to Exeter, but that intention was not implemented. The Southampton and Dorchester Railway was taken over by the LSWR on 22 July 1848.

The GWR planned a line to reach Weymouth, and it promoted a nominally independent company, the Wilts, Somerset and Weymouth Railway, which started construction from near Chippenham. It was taken over by the GWR on 14 March 1850, but progress in building towards Weymouth was slow; it finally reached the town via Yeovil and Dorchester, on 20 January 1857. The line had a separate station at Dorchester, and a connecting link was made to the Southampton and Dorchester (now LSWR) line. The GWR was required by the terms of its authorising act of Parliament to give running powers to the LSWR over the line from Dorchester to Weymouth, and "mixed gauge" track, that is track with rails both for broad gauge trains and narrow gauge trains, was provided.

The line passed through difficult terrain, and there were steep gradients and a tunnel. There was public demand for a station serving Upwey and Broadwey, and the GWR agreed to provide one if local subscriptions reached £150 toward the cost. This was done and the station opened at Upwey, (Note: Opening notices published by the GWR and reproduced in Jackson incorrectly spell the name Upway.) on the north side of what is now Old Station Road on 21 June 1871.

The broad gauge system of the GWR posed difficulties in arranging through traffic to other lines, as goods had to be transshipped and passengers were faced with a change of train. The directors decided to alter the track gauge and in a huge operation, the lines of the former Wilts, Somerset and Weymouth network were converted in June 1874. The Dorchester to Weymouth section was already mixed, of course, so that all that was needed was to remove the broad gauge rails.

=== Getting parliamentary authorisation ===
In the 1873 session of Parliament, a bill was presented for a line from the west end of Upwey station on the GWR to Portesham and Abbotsbury. Exploitation of mineral deposits, limestone, iron ore and oil-bearing shale, seems to have been the motivation. The bill was opposed by Henry Fox-Strangways, 5th Earl of Ilchester who owned substantial property in the area, and the scheme was thrown out.

Abbotsbury Railway Act 1877
- Act of Parliament
- Parliament of the United Kingdom
- Long title: An Act for incorporating the Abbotsbury Railway Company; and for other purposes.
- Citation: 40 & 41 Vict. c. ccxi

Dates
- Royal assent: 6 August 1877

Text of statute as originally enacted

Four years later the Earl had been mollified, for another bill was presented, which he did not oppose, and the Abbotsbury Railway Act 1877 (40 & 41 Vict. c. ccxi) obtained royal assent on 6 August 1877, capital £54,000. The engineer was William Clarke. Having obtained authority to raise the money, the task now was to actually get it, and a series of meetings were held at which rosy pictures of future prosperity were held out; indeed the iron ore alone made Abbotsbury capable of becoming a second Middlesbrough.

=== Money shortage and other problems ===
Two practical problems emerged in 1878 over the route of the line. The first was that the plans deposited for the Abbotsbury Railway Act 1877 showed a junction at Upwey aligned towards Dorchester. In view of the steep upward gradient of the main line there, which was in any case well above the level of the approach from Abbotsbury, this made the junction impracticable. The second was that speculators had purchased the land required for the line and sliced it up in such a way that the railway would have to buy unnecessarily large areas of land at high prices.

The latter difficulty induced the directors to consult with the GWR, after which they decided to alter the junction so as to face Weymouth. The first sod had been cut immediately prior to 8 April 1879, and work proceeded; the contractor was Monk & Edwards of Chester. However shortage of subscribed capital was a continuing problem, and in October the company failed to pay Monk & Edwards moneys due to them; a hasty compromise was reached and work continued.

An extraordinary general meeting took place on 13 February 1880, at which it was asserted that the construction of the Weymouth-facing junction at Upwey was outside the company's powers. The defensive explanation of the directors makes it clear that this was the case, and the meeting was asked to approve the change, and to approve a new parliamentary bill to authorise it. However shortage of money was still the pressing problem, and Monk & Edwards were unable to continue the work without it, and in October 1880 they took legal action against the company to recover sums due to them: over £10,000, they claimed.

A company without funds and with a judgment against it for default on paying its contractor was obviously going to find it difficult to resume construction work; and so it proved. A small series of apparently willing contractors were found, only for them to leave the negotiation at the last minute, until a deal was struck with Green and Burleigh, a London company, were prepare to complete the work "for the remainder of the shares and debentures". (Note: They would receive all the unissued shares in the company in payment, and would be creditors for the full authorised amount of the debenture loan, one third of the value of the share capital. In fact Green and Burleigh owned £32,770 face value of shares and the general public £21,230.)

Abbotsbury Railway Act 1882
- Act of Parliament
- Parliament of the United Kingdom
- Long title: An Act to confer further powers on the Abbotsbury Railway Company; to revive the powers and extend the period for the compulsory purchase of lands; for the construction of portions of the railway authorised by the Abbotsbury Railway Act, 1877; for making a diversion of part of their authorised line and for other purposes.
- Citation: 45 & 46 Vict. c. xii

Dates
- Royal assent: 19 May 1882

Other legislation
- Relates to: Abbotsbury Railway Act 1877

Text of statute as originally enacted

The company had by now, on 19 May 1882, obtained a further act of Parliament, the Abbotsbury Railway Act 1882 (45 & 46 Vict. c. xii), authorising the altered junction arrangement at Upwey, and to issue £10,000 in preference shares and an additional £3,000 of debenture loan. On 8 February 1883 the Great Western Railway had agreed to work the line for 50% of gross receipts. Having only secured subscribed capital of 39% of the authorised value from the public when the line captured local imagination, it was clearly impossible to issue the preference shares now that the line was in financial trouble, and an approach was made to the Great Western Railway to take the shares. In April 1884 it was reported that Green and Burleigh were not progressing the work as fast as was hoped, and the directors write to them, expressing their disappointment. At this time there were still 20 parcels of land required for the construction and not yet acquired.

On 5 September 1884 it was reported that construction work was at a standstill; Mr Burleigh had failed to attend the last four meetings. A notice was sent to him stating that the works would be put in the hands of another contractor unless he resumed the work immediately. Green and Burleigh were the majority shareholder, of course. It may be surmised that Green and Burleigh themselves were financially embarrassed, for at a meeting on 7 October 1884 Burleigh introduced a Mr George Barclay Bruce, who undertook to complete the works, taking over all the shares allocated to Green and Burleigh; this arrangement was formalised on 16 December 1884. Burleigh and Green (as the partnership seemed to be styled now) went into liquidation in March 1885.

At the annual general meeting on 19 March 1885 it was announced that the Great Western Railway had agreed to a loan of £10,000, (Note: The original proposal was that the GWR might take the £10,000 of preference shares. Instead a loan guaranteed against those shares was probably a device to overcome legal objections to the GWR becoming a significant shareholder in another railway company.) and also to the construction (by them) of an interchange station at "Broadwey Junction".

=== Last lap to opening ===
The half yearly shareholders' meeting on 2 October 1885 was held in Weymouth, and it concluded with a trip to Abbotsbury by train. At last the line was all but complete. Colonel Rich of the Board of Trade carried out the formal inspection on 28 October 1885. He found the line generally satisfactory, although a large number of minor technical points concerned with the signalling were commented upon. The working arrangement was to be "one engine in steam" for the time being, until the junction station at Upwey was completed, passenger trains were to run through to Weymouth.

The line opened to the public on 9 November 1885. Six miles of railway had taken six years to build, and three men had lost their lives during the construction. At the beginning of 1886 the GWR remitted the first instalment of the Abbotsbury Railway's share of receipts for the half year: £99 12s 8d.

The GWR junction station was to be called Broadwey Junction, but it was not ready for opening day, so for a period trains on the branch terminated at the Abbotsbury Railway Broadway station, and onward passengers were conveyed by horse and carriage to Upwey GWR station. On 19 April 1886 the junction station was ready, now to be called Upwey Junction, so that the stations on the line were then:

- Upwey Junction: GWR station on the main line, with a platform for branch trains; the junction was a short distance to the south;
- Broadway
- Portesham
- Abbotsbury.

The GWR Upwey station was closed on the same day. As it had been built partly from a public subscription, a Mr John Lipscombe wrote to the GWR asking for a refund of the money, but there is no record that it was given.

Note: the spellings of Broadwey were very inconsistent, even on official GWR notices, and Ordnance Survey maps of the period used Broadway for the settlement. Broadway station was officially renamed Broadwey on 24 June 1896.

The hoped-for boom in extraction of iron ore and other minerals did not happen, but an unexpected rush of day tripper traffic took place in the spring and summer of 1886; on Easter Monday the afternoon train from Weymouth had been formed of two engines and 18 carriages. In the following year, however, the novelty value had worn off and passenger carryings settled down. In 1890 the directors reported that income for a certain period had amounted to £419 but interest payments on the loans amounted to £907, and the total outstanding debt was £4,609.

The initial train service was four passenger trains each way daily except Sunday, and ran through to and from Weymouth. The service timetable for 1889 shows that the goods train is running as a mixed (passenger and goods) train, and there is a new entry: at 4.30 a.m. a "Contl. Fish" (Continental fish) train ran if required to Weymouth, returning empty. If the train was to run, special arrangements had to be made the afternoon before to ensure that the junction signal box was open and ready.

Initially intermediate stations were provided at Upwey and Portesham. Coryates Halt, between the two, was opened in May 1906 as part of a GWR scheme to run railmotors to compete with the rising threat of local buses. There was also a platform used solely for loading milk, at Friar Waddon. Its location is now uncertain.

An incline was constructed at Portesham to link local quarries on the hill near the Hardy Monument to the line although the actual traffic from this source proved disappointing.

== An accident ==
A derailment occurred on 23 January 1894: the 6 p.m. passenger train from Weymouth to Abbotsbury hauled by Armstrong standard good locomotive no 52 running tender first was negotiating the sharp curve between Upwey Junction and Upwey stations. The leading (in the direction of travel) coupled wheels derailed to the right, by the flange climbing the high rail. The parliamentary plans showed the curve to be 12 chains radius, but there was a short section at 8½ chains. The locomotive class had a relatively long rigid wheelbase, at 15ft 8ins and there was no check rail. The driver was found to be working regular shifts of 14 hours 5 minutes on six days a week, although this was not contributory to the accident.

Major Marindin was the Board of Trade inspector and as well as calling attention to the hours of duty, he recommended that the sharpest part of the curve should be eased and relaid "with a chair road", (the existing track was flat-bottom rail spiked direct to the sleepers); to fit a check-rail and to increase slightly the slackness of gauge; and "to work passenger trains on the branch only with tank engines and as far as possible to avoid running six-wheel coupled engines upon it".

This ban in the meantime left the motive power duties on the line to other designs, notably the 0-4-2T's which ran for many years. The "517" class gave way to the "14xx"class which were used for passenger and goods traffic until closure. Steam rail motors ran on the line for a few years but having the same weaknesses here as elsewhere were converted to auto trailers. Towards the end of the line's existence GWR diesel railcars were used to reduce costs.

== Takeover by the GWR ==
The end of the independent existence of the Abbotsbury Railway came suddenly, when a board meeting on 19 November 1895 approved the terms of a sale to the GWR. The purchase was formalised on 7 August 1896 by the Great Western Railway (Additional Powers) Act 1896 (59 & 60 Vict. c. ccxxxii). The purchase cost the GWR £27,561.

== Railmotors ==
In 1905 the GWR introduced railmotors, self contained passenger coaches with their own steam power unit, in order to respond to the demand for frequent passenger trains stopping more frequently. Additional halts were opened between Dorchester and Weymouth, served by the new trains. The first train from Weymouth and its return working were operated by railmotors from early June 1905, and there was now a Sunday passenger service, all worked by railmotors. The entire branch train service was worked by railmotors from 1 October 1905.

In May 1906 a halt was opened at Coryates, between Portesham and Broadwey. Broadway station had been renamed Broadwey in 1895, and on 1 January 1913 Broadwey station was renamed Upwey, to avoid confusion with Broadway in Worcestershire.

== Road competition ==
At the end of the First World War many independent operators started to run commercial road services. As well as goods lorries, these included scheduled bus services and coaches for excursions. These facilities were cheaper and more flexible than the railway service, and competition from them hit the railway hard. The decline in income was to become serious.

In the summer of 1932 a "milk platform" was opened on the branch at Friar Waddon, between Upwey and Coryates. Jackson says that it "henceforth appeared as a recognised stopping place in the working timetable". In fact a 1933 working timetable is reproduced by Jackson, showing only a weekday train to Abbotsbury calling there (at 3:40 p.m.) and a Sundays-only milk train from Portesham to Upwey Junction, calling at 4:21 p.m. (There was no ordinary Sunday train service at this time.) There were dairies close to the line to the north and south. The platform was simply a short timber stage. It does not appear in public timetables, for example Bradshaw July 1938.

== Topography ==
The Down direction was from Upwey Junction to Abbotsbury.

The physical junction at Upwey Junction was immediately south of the station; the branch line descended steeply from the junction, while the main line continued to climb. The line was falling at 1 in 44 and unfitted goods trains required to stop to pin down brakes. Upwey station was at 0m 35c, and gradients were more moderate from there passing Friar Waddon Milk Platform at 2m 00c and climbing at 1 in 228 and then a short length of 1 in 60 to Coryates Halt, 2m 79c. Continuing then at 1 in 60 rising, the line reached Portesham at 4m 47c. The line then fell with a ruling gradient of 1 in 60 to Abbotsbury at 6m 3c.

When the line was first built, a siding ran from the Upwey end of Portesham on the north side of the line, curving north to serve a quarry. It connected with a cable-operated incline to the quarry itself.

Although the line was worked on the one engine in steam principle, in the early years there were signal boxes at all the stations. The points were not locked by key on the train staff as was the later custom, and ordinary running signals indicated the lie of the points. From 1904 the signal boxes were abolished and replaced with ground frames.

== Twentieth century train services ==
As described above steam railmotors were introduced in the area from 1905. This did not displace locomotives completely, and a number of 517 class 0-4-2T locomotives were in use with auto-trailers in the area. Both forms of train were referred to as railmotors and there is some ambiguity about the term; it is likely that both forms of traction co-existed. The goods service declined in volume considerably in the 1920s, and the goods trains were reduced at first to three days a week, and later to mixed trains only.

From September 1937 a new series of 0-4-2T was introduced, the 48XX class, and they came to dominate working on the branch. They were renumbered in the 14XX series later, a number sequence that had been used for earlier types of the same wheel arrangement.

In February 1936 the first GWR diesel railcar allocation to Weymouth took place, and in due course this type appeared on the Abbotsbury branch. In the summer of 1939 there were seven passenger trains each way daily, and four on Sundays, the latter being worked by the GWR diesel railcars.

== Final decline and closure ==
Following the Second World War, carryings on the line declined further as road passenger and goods services improved, and it soon became obvious that the life of the line was limited. Despite local protests, the last train ran on 29 November 1952. The short spur from Upwey Junction to Upwey station was retained and Upwey becoming a goods station only, as no facilities for goods existed on the main line.

Upwey Junction was renamed Upwey & Broadwey on 1 December 1952.

Upwey Goods station closed on 31 December 1961.

== Film ==
The line makes short appearances in the Powell and Pressburger film The Small Back Room.
