= Laura Kampf =

German YouTuber and craftswoman (born 1983)

- Born: Anna Laura Kampf; 15 August 1983 (age 43); Wiehl, Germany
- Spouse: Corinne Brinkerhoff (m. 2024)

YouTube information
- Channel: Laura Kampf
- Years active: 2015–present
- Genres: Maker; DIY
- Subscribers: 852 thousand
- Views: 111 million
- Last updated: Apr 2026
- Website: www.laurakampf.com

Anna Laura Kampf (born 15 August 1983) is a German YouTuber, craftswoman, and children's television presenter from Cologne. She refers to herself as a maker, and her content focuses on build projects. She is one of the most popular German makers, with a large American audience.

After becoming self-taught in craftwork, Kampf began making YouTube videos in 2015, and she has posted weekly since 2016. Her channel has featured various projects, including home improvement renovations such as tiny house builds, as well as humorous designs. A 2019 video featuring a bicycle side-car made from a beer keg received millions of views. She has also collaborated with other makers, including several projects with Simone Giertz. Kampf's television career began with co-hosting the competition series Schrott or Not on KiKa in 2017, and she has hosted a segment on Die Sendung mit der Maus called Lauras Machgeschichten since 2018.

== Early life ==
Anna Laura Kampf was born on 15 August 1983 and grew up in Wiehl, Germany. Her father was an advertiser and a lawyer, and her mother was a housewife. Her grandmother was a hairdresser, the only family member to work in the trades.

Kampf struggled in high school classes, particularly mathematics. After high school, Kampf initially trained as a media designer, holding an apprenticeship at Mediengestalter Bild und Ton. She considered careers as a film editor or a camera operator, working as a camera assistant for three years. She then studied communication design at the Düsseldorf University of Applied Sciences from 2006 to 2012.

Kampf became self-taught in craftwork to give herself more freedom and to do something new, feeling bored with working in front of a computer. She made her first machine—a small, poorly functioning tattoo machine—during a college class. She learned to repair things from YouTube tutorials. The first tool she learned to use was a soldering iron, followed by a jigsaw and a welding machine. In 2010, after quitting a job at an apparel company, she moved out of her apartment and set up a workshop with a caravan in the Ehrenfeld neighbourhood of Cologne. She moved out of the workshop after getting a job, then set up a new workshop two years later. She relocated a few more times; by 2017, her workshop was in the Bickendorf neighbourhood of Cologne.

== Career ==
Based in Cologne, Kampf began making YouTube videos on her eponymous channel in 2015. Her first video was wordless and showed her building a lamp out of walnut wood. Kampf told Kölnische Rundschau, "At first, I had seven subscribers, seven of which I knew." She began posting videos weekly in 2016. She also began posting on Instagram, Facebook, and Twitter. She took a job at a bar to finance her projects. Kampf's early videos were wordless, contributing to her popularity outside of Germany. Alongside her build videos, with projects including a motorized raft, Kampf posted some personal vlogs.

Popular Mechanics magazine called Kampf a "rising star among DIYers on YouTube" in August 2016. By this time, it was her full-time job. In response to the US presidential campaign of Donald Trump, Kampf collaborated with US-based Swedish maker YouTuber Simone Giertz on a video in which they built "The Pussy Grabs Back Machine". Kampf has frequently collaborated with Giertz since then. Other projects on Kampf's channel in 2016 and early 2017 included a multipurpose star key (inspired by Jimmy DiResta), a loft bed, butcher block side tables, a steel tape dispenser, a cargo rack sized for her bicycle, a wooden box for a projector, and a multi-tool on a bracelet from a repurposed bicycle chain. Kampf told Make magazine in 2017 that her favorite creation was a carousel for children designed from a bicycle wheel, which she had named the "Happy Machine".

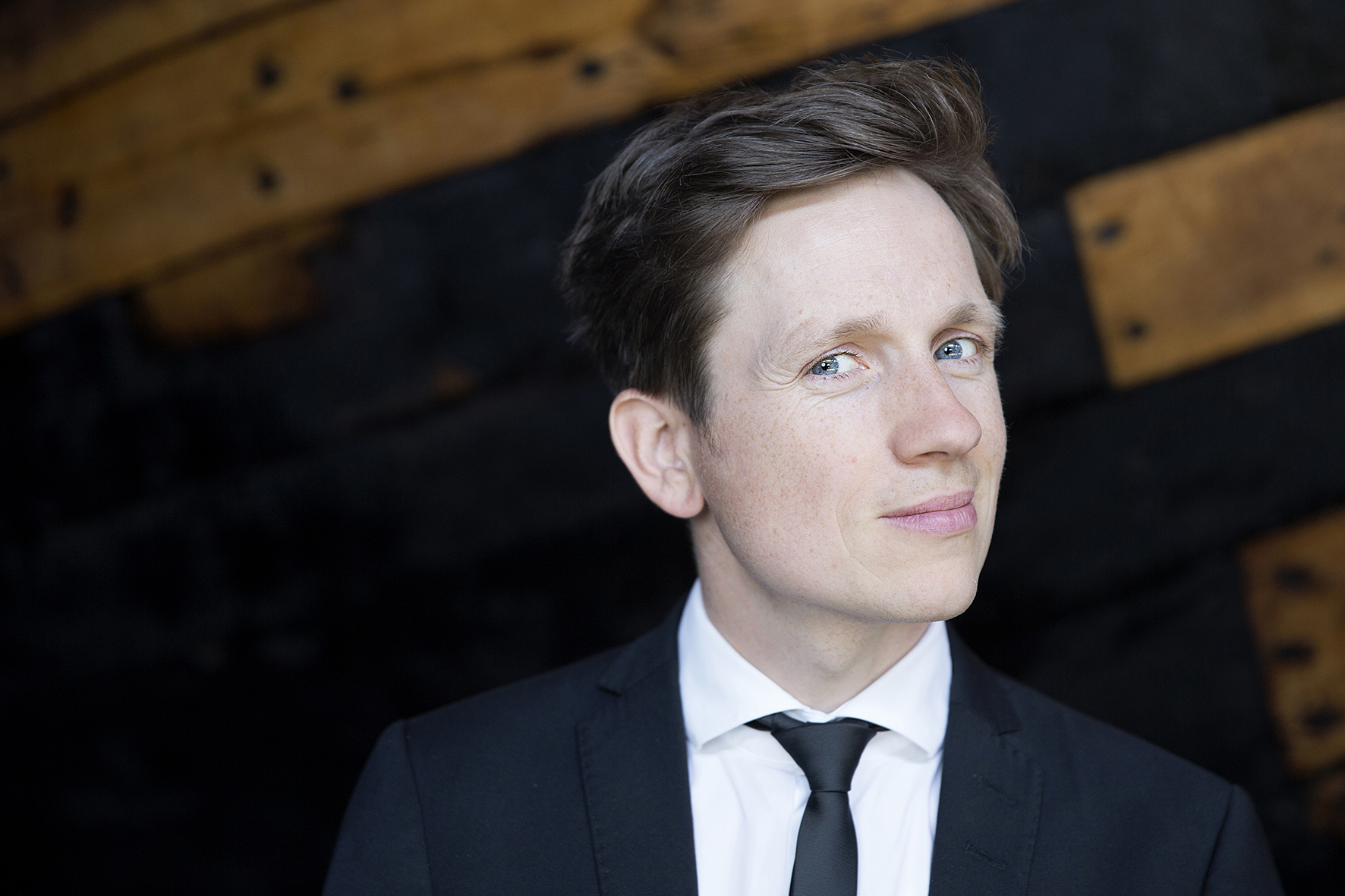
Kampf cohosted the 2017 series Schrott or Not with Johannes Büchs (pictured).

The children's television network KiKa began working with Kampf after becoming aware of her videos. She worked on a sixteen-episode show, Schrott or Not ("Trash or Not"), which she cohosted with Johannes Büchs. It began airing on the network in April 2017; it was Kampf's television debut. This show was filmed in her workshop and featured children competing in two teams to build things using trash materials.

Kampf's YouTube channel had 200,000 subscribers by May 2017. The same month, Kampf appeared with American maker Adam Savage on his Tested.com series One Day Builds, creating a tape dispenser that holds multiple rolls. Beginning in September 2017, Kampf built a tiny house from a modified construction trailer, which she documented in a series of videos titled "Tiny House Trailer". This became her residence. In 2018, she renovated a van into a camper van, and she created a pocket-sized container for screwdriver bits made from a lighter. In a January 2019 video, Kampf built a side-car for her bicycle made from a beer keg, which she said was unstable and did not ultimately work. This video received over 6,000,000 views within a year.

After Schrott or Not, Kampf began working on the children's show Die Sendung mit der Maus. She hosted a segment called "Lauras Machgeschichten" ("Laura's Making Stories"; a variation of the show's "Sachgeschichten", or "Documentary Stories"), which debuted in the Christmas season of 2018. In her first appearance, she built a snowman-shaped lamp. Kampf told Kölnsiche Rundschau that she had creative control over her segments, which she produced with a small team. Kampf appeared on the show on Transgender Day of Visibility 2022, in which she spoke with a trans woman and discussed the proposal for a law facilitating changing gender markers.

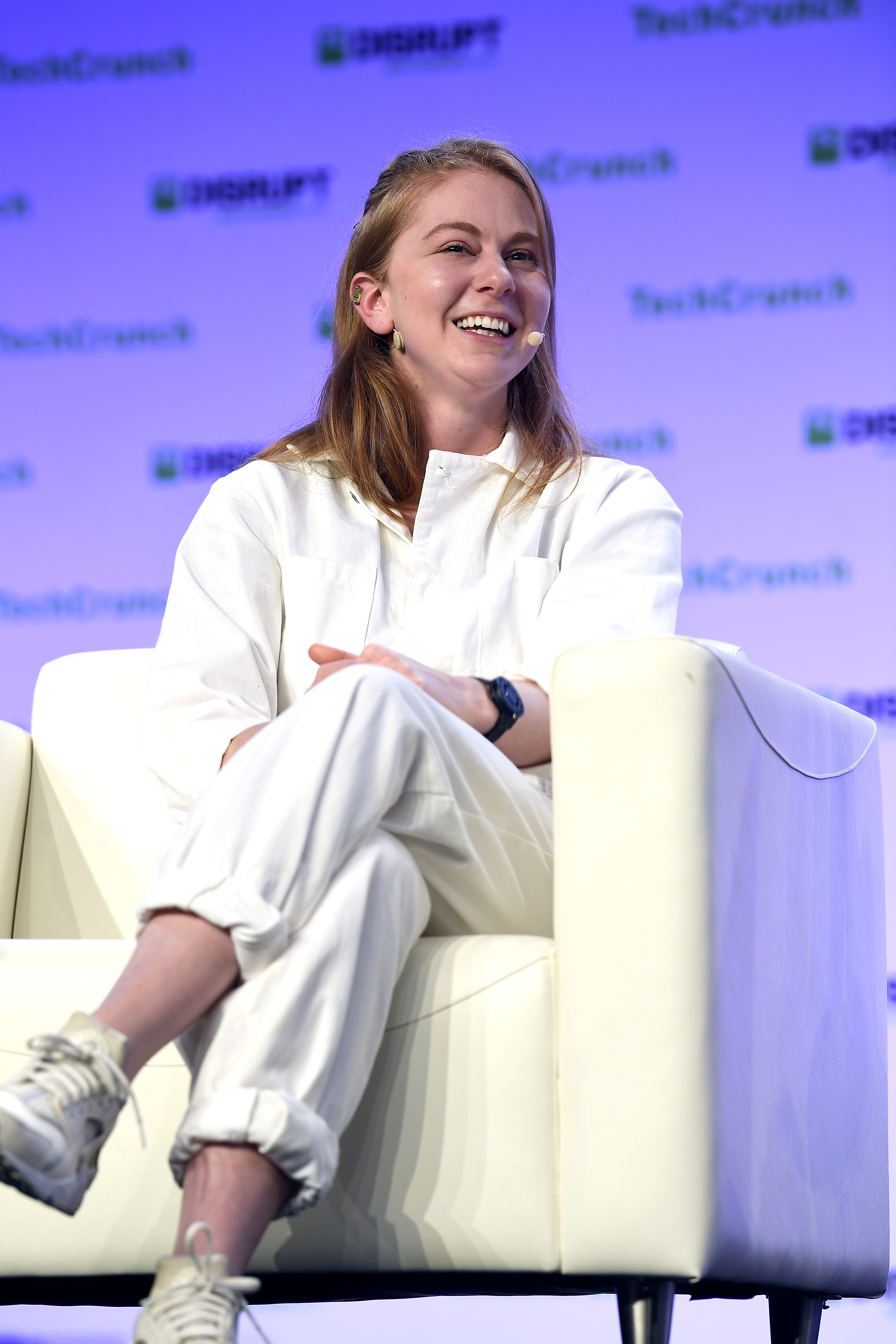
Kampf has collaborated with Simone Giertz (pictured) on several projects.

Kampf and Giertz worked with Savage in his 2019 series Savage Builds, building battle cars in the style of the Mad Max films. The same year, Kampf worked on Giertz's project Truckla, a Tesla Model 3 adapted to be a truck. Since 2019, Kampf has cohosted the podcast Raabe & Kampf with author Melanie Raabe, her childhood friend, on which the two discuss creativity. Kampf's YouTube channel had 500,000 subscribers by 2020. As she gained fame, she was a guest on Westdeutscher Rundfunk's radio programme Kölner Treff in March 2020. Projects on Kampf's YouTube channel in 2021 and 2022 included a bike trailer made from second-hand wheelbarrows, a box with clamps to keep sandpaper flat, and a barbecue grill made from a toolbox.

In 2022, Kampf purchased and began renovating a 120-year-old house near her workshop, which she named Liselotte, after its former resident. This became the focus of many of her videos. Meanwhile, she worked on another tiny house in a video titled "Building a Tiny House in 12 weeks under 10,000?"

By 2023, Kampf's content grew to a production studio with two employees. They had a workshop in Oberbergischer Kreis, near Cologne, on a site with former factories. By this time, her channel had over 800,000 subscribers, and her videos received 200,000 views on average. In May 2023, Kampf appeared on the American version of Sesame Street, followed by an appearance with German comedian Carolin Kebekus. The same year, ahead of her fortieth birthday, she posted a video in which she built a mobile sandwich toaster.

Kampf married Corinne Brinkerhoff in 2024. In 2024 and 2025, Kampf's YouTube videos featured an illuminated sculpture of a tumbleweed, a new woodworking joint style using a domino joiner, and a hovercraft suitcase, and she appeared in a video by Giertz making a pair of safety goggles that functions as a ruler.

== Style ==
Kampf calls herself a maker, a subculture based on building things out of personal interest, though she has said she wants to avoid strict categories. On her channel, Kampf has built many projects, largely focusing on home improvement and solutions to everyday problems. Some of her projects are useful, while others are funny or absurd; her useful projects are usually more popular. She focuses on a learning-by-doing ethos. Many of her projects fail, and she expresses excitement in videos where they succeed. Several of her creations include bicycle parts. The slogan "every defect gets respect", a lyric by Canadian musician Peaches, is written across her workshop. Kampf told Die Zeit that she relates this phrase to her creations as well as her personality.

As of 2023, Kampf has posted a YouTube video every week since 2016. Her videos are about four or five minutes long, and they are mostly in English. Kampf spends about four days to create each project, and she does not script them as she works on projects without specific instructions. She films each shot from multiple angles and in different lighting. She edits her videos herself, with about 200 cuts in each video and upbeat music. Her dog, Smudo, often appears. Kampf, who is lesbian, occasionally places rainbow flags in the background of her videos.

Kampf's YouTube channel is her source of income, as her products are not made to be sold. She has been sponsored by major tool companies, placing their products in her videos. These include Lincoln Electric, an American company that has used her videos to target a German market. She has few sponsors, requiring that they give her creative control. Kampf additionally receives donations on Patreon, where she has blog posts and livestreams for donors. In 2017, she received about 1,670 euros (or 2,000 US dollars) per month from 600 Patreon donors. She also sells merchandise with her logo.

Writing for Emma magazine, Annika Ross described Kampf as "Germany's most successful maker". Kampf's audience is largely male and American, as this demographic comprises much of the maker subculture. She has worked with several people in the American maker subculture. In Germany, Kampf is primarily recognised for Die Sendung mit der Maus, according to Die Zeit in 2023.

== Reception and awards ==
Writing for Die Zeit, Pauline Schinkels described Kampf as "the opposite of an engineer" for her emphasis on improvisation and repurposing. Schinkels stated that Kampf's projects are appealing in contrast to the ubiquity of useful technology, comparing her to Giertz in this regard. Ross of Emma magazine compared her to the fictional characters Gyro Gearloose and MacGyver, while Martina Windrath of Kölnische Rundschau compared her to Pippi Longstocking for the unconventional style of her creations. Writing for The Spectator, Ian Sansom praised Kampf's unusual ideas and called her "seriously German".

In 2020, Kampf was awarded a Goldene Kamera Digital Award in the category, Best of Education & Coaching, having been a nominee for the same award in 2019. At the 2021 Webby Awards, a project featuring Kampf and Savage, "Fire Up 2021", won the People's Voice award in the category Events & Live Streams (Branded).
