= Giertz =

Giertz is a surname. Notable people with the surname include:

- Bo Giertz (1905–1998), Swedish Lutheran theologian, novelist and bishop
- Caroline Giertz (born 1958), Swedish author and television presenter
- Sam Giertz (born 1977), Swedish entrepreneur
- Simone Giertz (born 1990), Swedish inventor, maker, robotics enthusiast, TV host, and professional YouTuber
