= American Gothic (2016 TV series) =

2016 American mystery drama television series

- Genre: Mystery; Drama
- Created by: Corinne Brinkerhoff
- Starring: Juliet Rylance; Antony Starr; Justin Chatwin; Megan Ketch; Elliot Knight; Stephanie Leonidas; Gabriel Bateman; Virginia Madsen
- Composer: Jeff Russo
- Country of origin: United States
- Original language: English
- No. of seasons: 1
- No. of episodes: 13

Production
- Executive producers: Matt Shakman; Todd Cohen; James Frey; Justin Falvey; Darryl Frank; Corinne Brinkerhoff
- Producer: Shauna Jamison
- Cinematography: Alan Caso
- Running time: 40–43 minutes
- Production companies: Full Fathom Five; Hyla Regilla Productions; Amblin Television; CBS Television Studios

Original release
- Network: CBS
- Release: June 22 – September 7, 2016

American Gothic is an American mystery drama television series created by Corinne Brinkerhoff. CBS announced a 13-episode straight-to-series order on October 9, 2015. The show premiered on June 22, 2016. On October 17, 2016, CBS cancelled the series after one season.

== Plot ==
The Hawthornes, an affluent Boston family, must redefine themselves following the discovery that their recently deceased patriarch could have been a serial killer. Suspicion arises that one of them may have been his accomplice.

== Cast and characters ==
=== Main ===
- Juliet Rylance as Alison Hawthorne-Price the bisexual eldest sister of the family who is running for mayor
- Antony Starr as Garrett Hawthorne the mysterious prodigal eldest brother who has returned from a 14-year absence
  - Micheal Doonan as Young Garrett Hawthorne
- Justin Chatwin as Cameron "Cam" Hawthorne the younger brother, a cartoonist and recovering drug addict, and husband of Sophie and father of Jack
- Megan Ketch as Tessa Ross the younger sister and wife of Brady
- Elliot Knight as Brady Ross a police officer for the Boston Police Department and husband of Tessa
- Stephanie Leonidas as Sophie Hawthorne Cam's wife and the mother of Jack
- Gabriel Bateman as Jack Hawthorne the psychopathic son of Cam and Sophie
- Virginia Madsen as Madeline Hawthorne, wife of Mitch and mother of Alison, Garrett, Tessa, and Cam

=== Recurring ===
- Enrico Colantoni as Mayor Conley, the incumbent candidate Alison is running against in the upcoming election, a former safety inspector
- Jamey Sheridan as Mitch Hawthorne, husband of Madeline, father of Alison, Garrett, Tessa, and Cam
- Dylan Bruce as Tom Price, Alison's husband
- Maureen Sebastian as Naomi Flynn, Alison's campaign manager and lover
- Deirdre Lovejoy as Detective Linda Cutter, Brady's superior and the lead investigator on the re-opened SBK case
- Catalina Sandino Moreno as Christina Morales, a doctor and the daughter of SBK's final victim
- Teresa Pavlinek as Dana, a medical examiner who works with Brady and Detective Cutter
- Sarah Power as Jennifer Windham, a television reporter
- Natalie Prinzen-Klages and Nora Prinzen-Klages as Harper and Violet Hawthorne-Price, daughters of Alison and Tom

== Reception ==
American Gothic holds a current score of 51 out of 100 on Metacritic based on 23 "mixed or average" reviews. The review aggregator website Rotten Tomatoes reports a 58% critics rating based on 24 reviews. The website consensus reads: "American Gothic may not be striving for much, yet it holds promise as a soapy, campy family murder-mystery that's ultimately just engaging enough."

== Episodes ==
Each episode of the series is named after a well-known American work of art, and features a visual reference to its namesake painting within the episode.

No.	Title	Directed by	Written by	Original release date	US viewers (millions)
1	"Arrangement in Grey and Black"	Matt Shakman	Corinne Brinkerhoff	June 22, 2016	3.43
The Hawthornes' money has come from the family's concrete business. However, the concrete was used in a tunnel that just collapsed. Found inside the rubble are the remains of an apparent victim of the "Silver Bells Killer", a serial murderer who terrorized the city 15 years ago. Mayoral candidate Alison Hawthorne-Price vows to find "SBK" if elected. Her father Mitch suffers a heart attack at her press conference. Meanwhile, in looking for brother Cam's drug stash, Tessa finds a box of silver bells, SBK's calling card, in a shed on the family estate. Garrett Hawthorne returns after a 14-year absence to visit his ailing father and whisper into his ear. Mitch tells wife Madeline that they "have to tell the truth." She cuts off his oxygen supply.
2	"Jack-in-the-Pulpit"	Greg Beeman	Corinne Brinkerhoff	June 29, 2016	3.58
After killing Mitch, Madeline is questioned by her family about the SBK collection in the shed. She explains that Mitch was always obsessed with true crime stories and bought the bells and newspaper clippings from a collector. However, Mitch began suffering from dementia in recent months, became convinced he was SBK, and suggested Madeline kill him. Tessa is suspicious about the dementia when others mention recently playing chess and bridge with Mitch. Detective Cutter begins investigating the tunnel collapse, as it now pertains to the SBK case. She asks Brady Ross, Tessa's husband, to find something with Mitch's DNA on it to connect him to SBK. Brady finds this impossible, as Madeline is removing everything of Mitch's from the house. The only connection is a photo of Cam wearing the same belt found with the tunnel victim.
3	"Nighthawks"	David Straiton	Meredith Averill	July 6, 2016	3.08
Garrett stalks a woman named Christina Morales (Catalina Sandino Moreno). He intentionally cuts himself to be stitched up by her, and she is revealed to be the daughter of an SBK victim. Madeline goes over Mitch's will with the family; he left everything to her. She plans to sell the concrete factory and later fires Gunther. Cam takes Jack to a former therapist of his and learns she recorded his sessions at the time. Sophie helps him steal the recordings, but he is caught on camera, which could damage Alison's campaign and risk his losing custody of Jack. Detective Cutter informs Madeline of having evidence she bought a belt similar to the one used in the tunnel murder. Brady interrupts them to exclaim that DNA and fingerprint evidence excludes any Hawthorne. Madeline suggests Gunther is the murderer, and he is later found hanged in the shed. A suicide note simply says: "I'm sorry." Guest stars: Stephen Gostkowski, the kicker for the New England Patriots, appeared as himself; he is brought in to endorse Alison.
4	"Christina's World"	P.J. Pesce	Lawrence Broch	July 13, 2016	2.77
When a woman crippled in the tunnel crash threatens to sue both the Hawthornes and the city, Alison and the mayor must team up to stop her. Madeline's neighbor inadvertently provides the police with evidence that proves Gunther couldn't have been SBK. Sophie's drug dealer threatens her and Cam over her debt to him. Garrett continues to get close to Christina. Madeline receives a cryptic message. Brady discovers that Tessa tampered with the DNA evidence in order to test his loyalty to her family, and he swears to close the case no matter who it takes down.
5	"The Artist in His Museum"	Hanelle Culpepper	Lauren MacKenzie & Andrew Gettens	July 20, 2016	2.44
Madeline confronts her mother, who she's been paying to stay away from the Hawthornes. Alison and Naomi must deal with a blackmail threat by a campaign staffer. Cam goes through withdrawal and relives some buried memories, while the police track him as a prime suspect in the SBK murders. A DNA test later proves his innocence, but indicates that some other member of the Hawthornes is the killer.
6	"The Chess Players"	Ed Ornelas	Allen MacDonald	July 27, 2016	2.36
News of the DNA connection comes out during Alison's debate with the mayor. While the Hawthornes hole up in their home waiting for the results of the police's tests, they turn on each other trying to find the truth. Meanwhile, Garrett takes Christina on a camping trip that ends in shocking events. The DNA tests reveal Mitch was SBK.
7	"The Gross Clinic"	Steph Green	Aaron Fullerton	August 3, 2016	2.51
The Hawthornes reel from the results of the police investigation. Jack continues to show troubling behavior. Brady and Cutter discover that SBK had an accomplice.
8	"Kindred Spirits"	Lexi Alexander	Deidre Shaw	August 10, 2016	2.38
Alison threatens Jennifer Windham, the reporter who had a dalliance with Tom and bugged their homes. Jack visits a summer camp and finds a kindred spirit in Sadie, who fires a crossbow they found at Garrett's cabin at him. Jack is expelled from summer camp after being found with a knife. Brady notices a chip in its ivory handle matches the triangular piece of ivory left at the final crime of SBK.
9	"The Oxbow"	Doug Aarniokoski	Lawrence Broch	August 17, 2016	2.37
As Garrett sits in jail under suspicion of being SBK's accomplice, he reflects on his time living in the Maine woods. Alison tries to use Jennifer Windham to dig up dirt on the mayor, only to turn her into a target for the returned Silver Bells Killer.
10	"The Veteran in a New Field"	David Barrett	Aaron Fullerton	August 24, 2016	2.57
Alison and Brady team up to investigate Jennifer's murder. Tessa questions her mother's honesty. Garrett is released from prison and proceeds to dig up and destroy human remains in a field.
11	"Freedom From Fear"	Jet Wilkinson	Andrew Gettens & Lauren MacKenzie	August 31, 2016	2.51
The Hawthorne family's darkest secrets are revealed through a series of flashbacks to 14 years prior.
12	"Madame X"	Ed Ornelas	Allen MacDonald & Lauren Goodman	September 7, 2016	2.55
As Alison's mayoral campaign reaches its climax, the police close in on the Silver Bells accomplice.
13	"Whistler's Mother"	Greg Beeman	Corinne Brinkerhoff & Aaron Fullerton	September 7, 2016	2.55
The Silver Bells Killer's accomplice is revealed, as the accomplice targets one of the Hawthornes on the same day Alison is elected mayor.
