= Simone Giertz =

Swedish inventor and robotics YouTuber

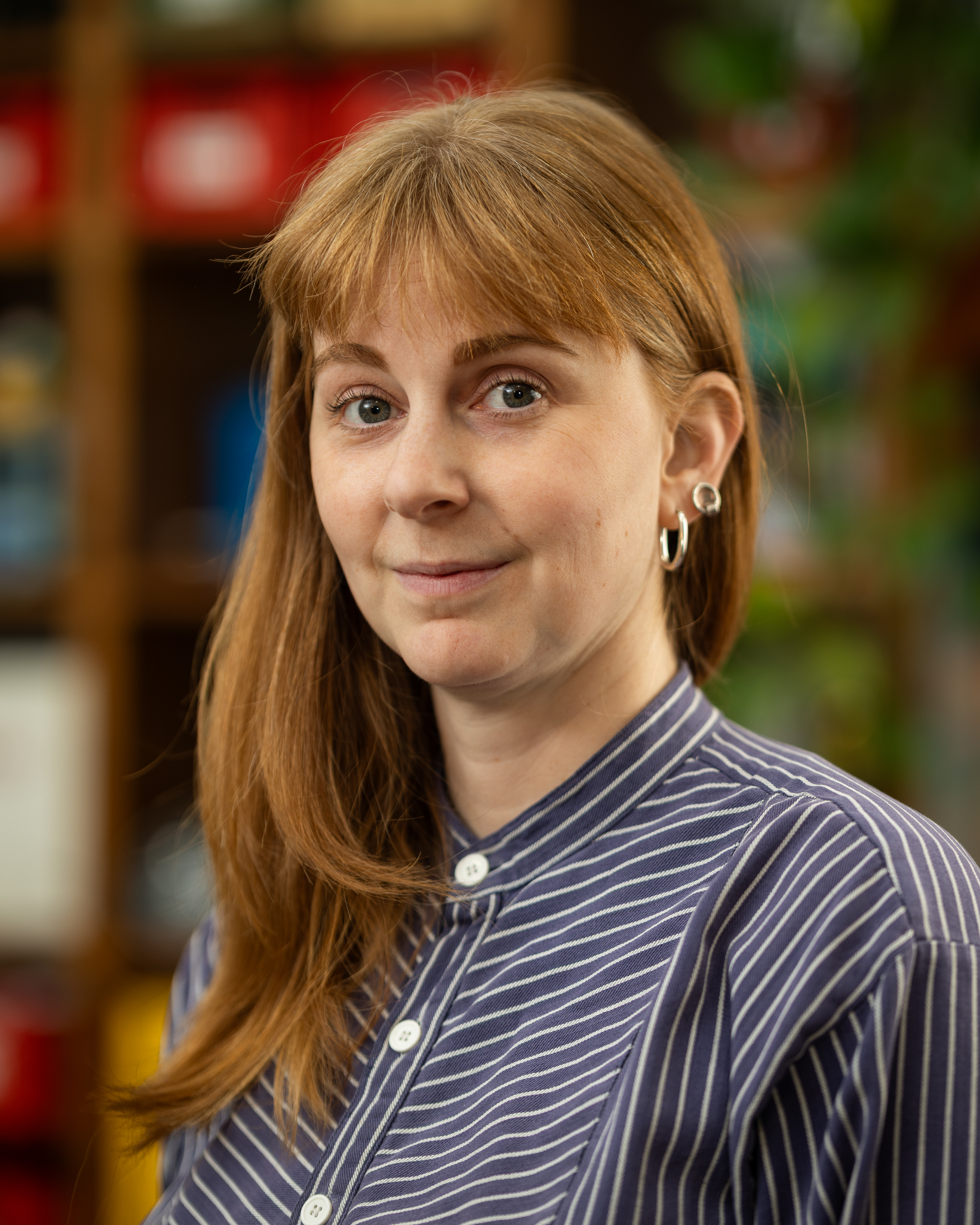
- Giertz in 2025
- Born: Simone Luna Louise Söderlund Giertz; November 1, 1990 (age 36); Stockholm, Sweden
- Occupations: YouTuber; inventor
- Parent: Caroline Giertz

YouTube information
- Channel: Simone Giertz
- Years active: 2013–present
- Genres: Maker; vlog; comedy
- Subscribers: 2.81 million
- Views: 195.8 million
- Last updated: 10 May 2025
- Giertz's voice Recorded 2016
- Website: simonegiertz.com

Simone Luna Louise Söderlund Giertz (/ˈjɛtʃ/ YETCH; Swedish: [ˈjæʈːʂ]; born November 1, 1990) is a US-based Swedish inventor and YouTuber who creates robot and maker videos. Her early videos in the 2010s involved robots that intentionally failed at everyday tasks, leading to the nickname "Queen of Shitty Robots". Later videos involved more useful projects, maintaining a comedic, rather than educational, tone. She has also designed products to sell, creating an online shop, the Yetch Store, in 2022.

Originally from the Stockholm area, Giertz was self-taught in robotics, gaining experience with hardware while studying at an advertising school. She created her YouTube channel in 2013 and posted her first robot video, featuring a tooth-brushing helmet, in August 2015. She continued to post short videos showing her creations, including "The Breakfast Machine" and "The Wake-up Machine" in November 2015, each of which received one million views. After a February 2016 video featuring a lipstick robot, Giertz gained the attention of presenter Adam Savage and began working on his series, Tested.com, in California. Giertz presented her robots during an appearance on The Late Show with Stephen Colbert and a TED talk. Giertz attempted to train herself to be an astronaut in a 2017 video series, which included two of her most viewed videos. She worked on larger projects around 2018, including a branded video to promote the television drama Westworld.

Giertz was diagnosed with a noncancerous brain tumor in April 2018. She posted humorous content about her health during two rounds of treatments over the following year. As she shifted away from her "shitty robots", Giertz began designing products. Her first release was the Every Day Calendar, a habit-tracking product that she had developed during her recovery and funded using Kickstarter in 2018. Giertz gained wider fame for Truckla, a project documented in June 2019, in which she and collaborators modified a Tesla car into a pickup truck; she was then invited to the launch of the official Tesla pickup truck. In the 2020s, several of Giertz's videos involved projects for her home and dog. Since 2022, she has sold her designs through the Yetch Store, including a jigsaw puzzle with an intentionally missing piece and a folding clothes hanger.

== Early and personal life ==
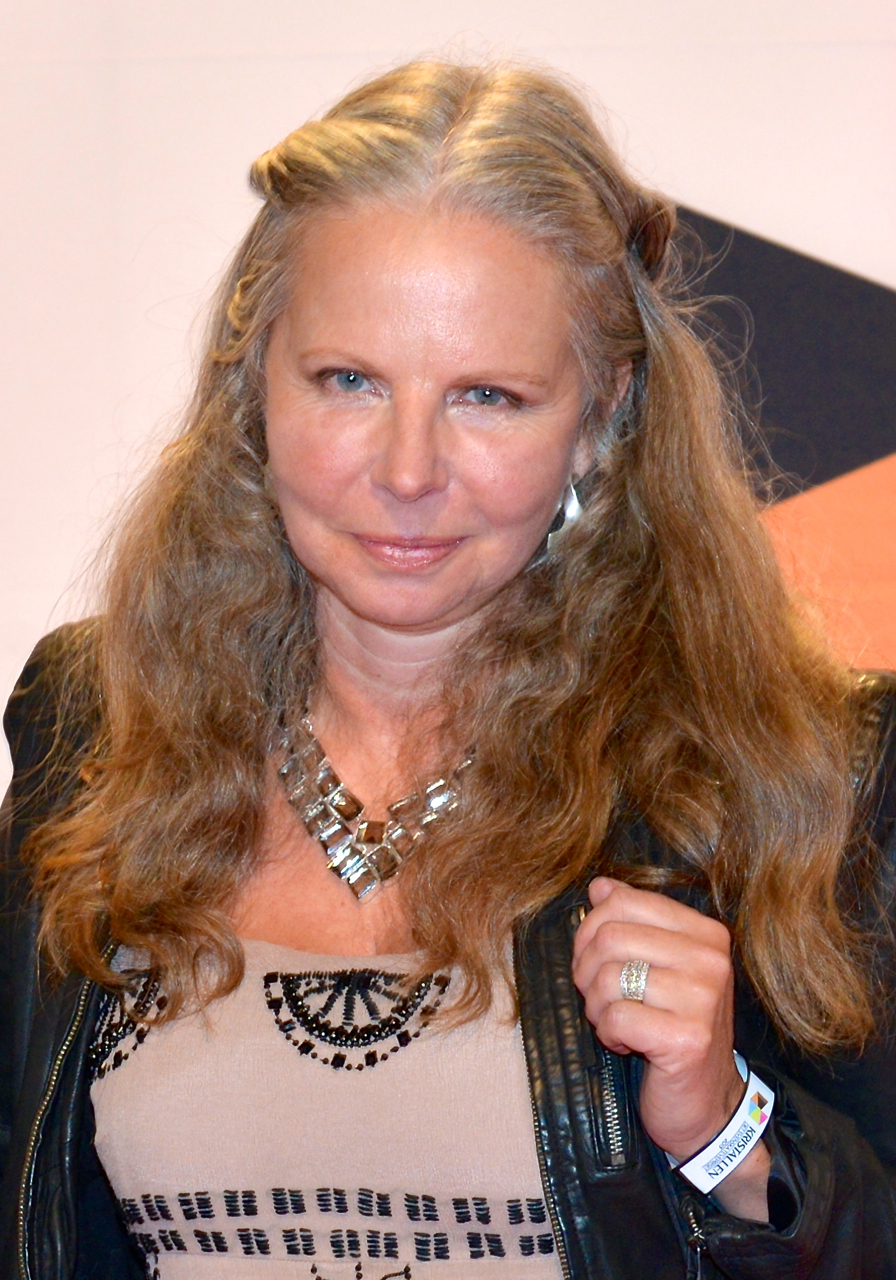
Giertz's mother, Caroline Giertz, in 2013

Simone Luna Louise Söderlund Giertz was born in Stockholm on November 1, 1990. Her mother is television host Caroline Giertz, who worked on reality television programs about ghost hunting, and her father worked as a television producer. The youngest of three siblings, Giertz was raised in a middle-class household in Saltsjö-Duvnäs, Sweden (near Stockholm). Giertz is a descendant of Lars Magnus Ericsson, founder of Ericsson.

In elementary school, Giertz was interested in woodworking. She has named the Disney cartoon character Gyro Gearloose as one of her earliest inspirations. Giertz felt obsessed with her grades in school and developed a fear of failure.

At the age of 16, Giertz spent a year in China as an exchange student. She stayed in Hefei, where she learned basic Mandarin. During her stay, she also made an appearance on a Chinese sitcom. Her parents got divorced while she was in China, which she was informed of the day she returned. Three months later, she enrolled in a Swedish boarding school in Nairobi, where she learned Swahili. After graduating from high school, she returned to China, spending six months in Nanhai, Guangdong. Giertz studied physics at the KTH Royal Institute of Technology, a research university in Stockholm, but dropped out after a year. In 2012, she became an editor for Sweden's official website, working on the Chinese-language version.

Giertz lived on a houseboat in Stockholm, which she had converted from a 1940s ship, from 2012 to 2016. In 2013, she began studying advertising at a trade school, Hyper Island in Stockholm. Giertz's interest in electronics began that year, when she attended a woman's talk about hacking hardware. To fulfill a curriculum requirement, Giertz had an internship in San Francisco as a product designer at the engineering company Punch Through Design, where she worked on projects with Arduino microcontrollers. After she quit her internship, her US visa lapsed, and she returned to Sweden to live with her mother. She also held brief jobs in technology journalism. Giertz was self-taught in robotics, making use of open-source hardware such as Arduino.

Giertz has said she strongly identifies as atheist or agnostic and that her diet is mostly vegan or plant-based.

== Career ==
=== Early career and "Queen of Shitty Robots" (2015–2018) ===
==== Early videos and Tested.com ====
External videos
- The Toothbrush Machine

Giertz created her YouTube channel in March 2013. The first video on this channel, posted on September 15, 2014, showed Giertz in front of a wall, showcasing her creation of a popcorn catapult. It received little attention. Her second YouTube video and first robot-themed video was posted in August 2015, featuring a toothbrush helmet. She had made the robot for a children's show pilot on electronics, but she posted it online after the show was not picked up. This video was seven seconds long and showed the helmet moving across her face without using toothpaste, unable to reach the back teeth. This video went viral. She began posting more robots inspired by everyday tasks. She posted twelve more videos in 2015, including one in which she electrically shocked her face while she read comments on her videos.

A video titled "The Breakfast Machine", posted in November 2015, was Giertz's first to feature a robotic arm. In the video, it poorly pours milk and cereal, then holds up an empty spoon. On November 11, she posted "The Wake-up Machine", an alarm clock that slapped the user by spinning a rubber hand that had originally been a Halloween decoration. She posted multiple versions of the video, including one that showed it tangling Giertz's hair. She would later say that this creation was "the first one that really took off". "The Breakfast Machine" and "The Wake-up Machine" each received one million views. In December 2015, she posted the "Chopping Machine", which used two knives to slice vegetables, in a video that parodied infomercials. Other creations included a drone that cut the user's hair (tested on a mannequin), a robot that used tongs and rubber hands to generate applause, one that shampooed the user's hair, and one that lifted up soup using 3D-printed parts. The short videos of her robots were accompanied by vlogs describing how they were designed. Content creation became Giertz's full-time job by March 2016, at which point her YouTube channel had over 100,000 subscribers. Her subscriber count reached 200,000 later that year.

Giertz's videos became popular on a subreddit called "Shitty Robots", with one post becoming the subreddit's most popular of all time. The subreddit's users gave her the nickname "Queen of Shitty Robots", which she began using herself. Most of Giertz's early videos received hundreds of thousands of views, including one that received 500,000 views within a day of being posted on Reddit. She also received tens of thousands of subscribers on Instagram. Gifs from her videos went viral on various websites.

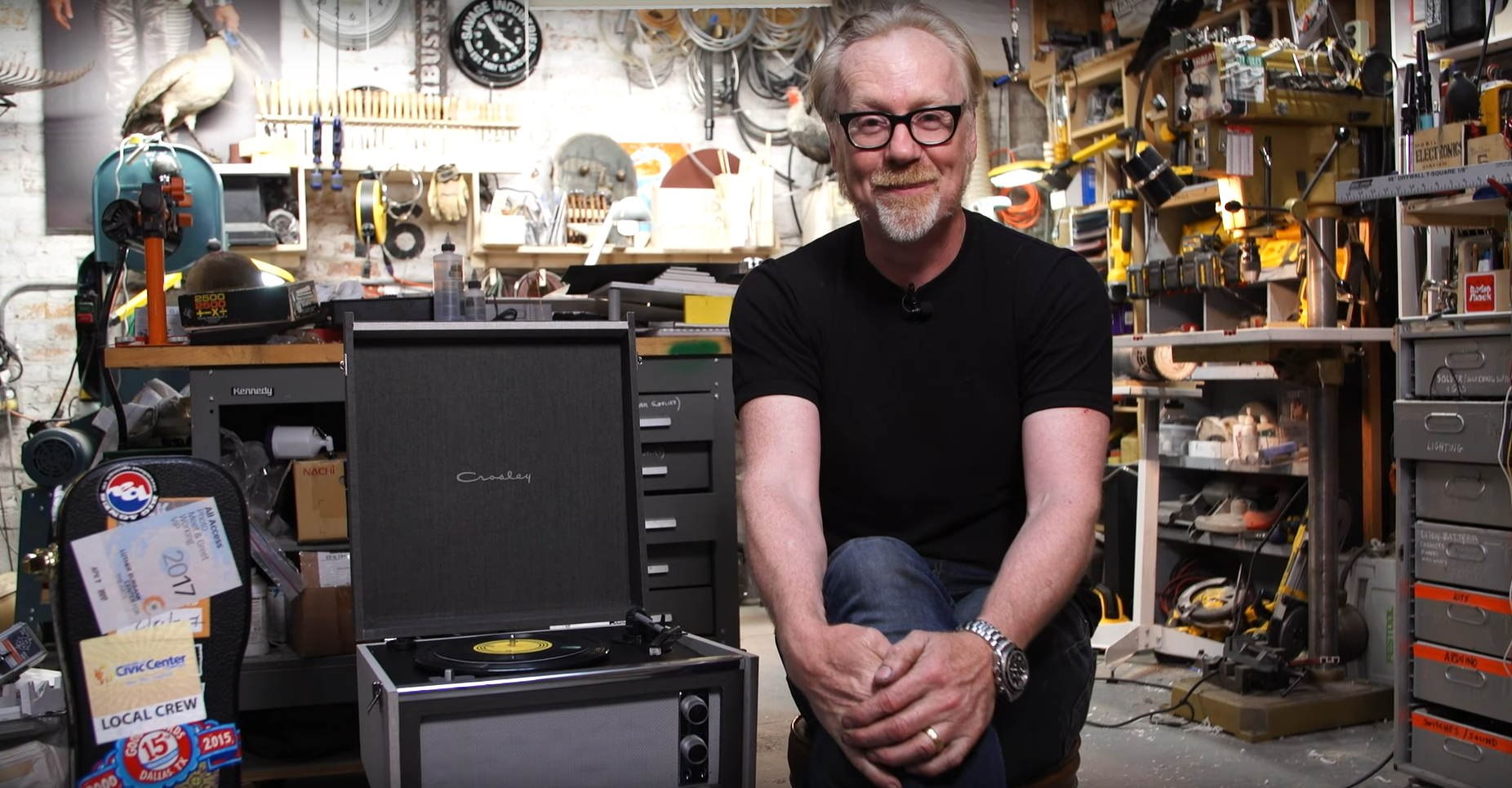
Giertz began working with Adam Savage's Tested.com in 2016.

Giertz's first video to become popular beyond YouTube was posted in February 2016. The video was six seconds long and showed a robot spreading lipstick across her chin while she appeared focused on reading on a tablet. It received over one million views. Adam Savage, former presenter on the television program MythBusters, enjoyed the video and offered to collaborate with her. Giertz then joined Savage's project Tested.com, collaborating on her first project with Savage, a helmet that fed its wearer popcorn, often missing the mouth. Giertz has called this her favorite of her robots. She moved to San Francisco when she began working with Tested.com, living in a loft apartment. She created further videos exclusive to paid subscribers of the website. Savage became a mentor to Giertz. In a video posted a few months later, Giertz said she had "had the worst impostor syndrome" about working with Savage.

==== Television appearances and other work ====
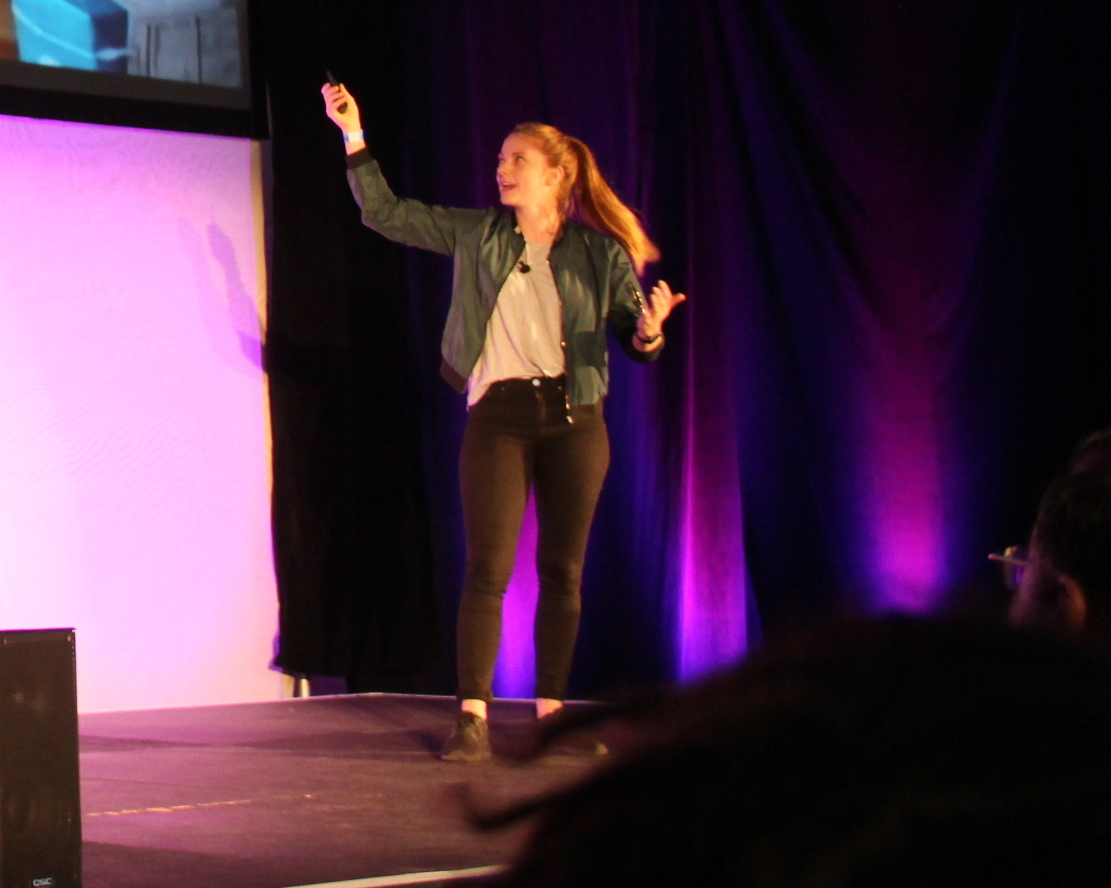
Giertz in 2016

Giertz showcased three of her robots on The Late Show with Stephen Colbert in late 2016, in which she demonstrated the lipstick robot on Colbert. She made other talk show appearances, including on the Spanish show El Hormiguero, and her video "The Wake-up Machine" was featured on The Ellen DeGeneres Show. Giertz hosted a 2016 video series by GoldieBlox, a toy company focused on teaching STEM to girls. Titled Toy Hackers, the seventeen-episode series featured Giertz alongside child YouTube stars.

In late 2016, she and German YouTuber Laura Kampf published a video in which they built "The Pussy Grabs Back Machine"—a reference to a comment by then-presidential candidate Donald Trump—that used a rubber hand to hit the groin of a person who grabbed the groin of the wearer. Giertz's sponsors disliked the video's profanity; in response, she deleted five videos, and later published a profanity-filled video titled "Why My Sponsors are Leaving". In December of that year, she created a Patreon account to receive money directly from viewers while announcing a deal with GoldieBlox to release child-appropriate edits of her videos. It released these edits under the title Scrappy Robots with Simone Giertz.

In a video posted in December 2016, Giertz created a "butt wiping machine", which used a power drill to forcefully spin a roll of toilet paper. Her robots posted in 2017 included a robot arm that placed down a glass and poured beer and a drone designed to carry a baby. In 2017, she co-hosted the comedy TV show Manick with Nisse Hallberg on Swedish TV6. The premise of the show is that the hosts invent funny, creative solutions to everyday problems. After getting an American driving license in 2017, Giertz drove a Comuta-Car—a yellow electric car from the 1970s—which she called Cheese Louise as it resembled a cheese wedge. In a February 2018 video, Giertz featured maker YouTuber William Osman, who modified the car to function as a computer mouse, with a video on Osman's channel explaining the process.

=== Shift toward larger projects (2018–2021) ===
==== Increase in production value and astronaut training series ====
As her popularity increased, Giertz received sponsorships from large companies such as Ericsson, Google, and Audible. Giertz attempted to train herself to go to space in a 2017 video series sponsored by Google. This series had a higher production value and filming quality than previous videos. This included a video titled "I Locked Myself in My Bathroom for 48 Hours", which was intended to simulate the isolation of a spaceship. It became her most viewed video, with 7.5 million views by April 2018. In the last video of the series, she rode a zero-gravity aircraft. This became her most viewed video by 2020, when it had eleven million views.

Giertz experienced burnout around 2017 from working on too many projects at a time. Around 2018, Giertz's YouTube videos became larger productions—having previously been made primarily by Giertz herself—but continued to mostly be about robots. These included a 22-minute video in which she hunted a robot, on which she credited dozens of people. In April 2018, she created a six-minute video to promote season 2 of HBO's Westworld, in collaboration with advertising studio Portal A Interactive. Based on the "host" robots in Westworld, she created a robot version of herself out of a medical dummy, and she recreated a scene of the character Dolores Abernathy. The same year, Giertz presented at a TED conference. In her twelve-minute TED talk, she encouraged useless ideas and fun inventions, and she described how her creations had helped her overcome performance anxiety. She illustrated her ideas by presenting her own projects and robots, including one that fed her water while she presented.

By the end of 2019, Giertz was in talks with a production company to make a series about her going to space. She hoped to be the first to create a show from space. She decided to cancel the production as she realized she was not as passionate about it as she had expected.

==== Brain tumor ====
External videos
- I have a brain tumor.

In April 2018, an MRI scan and subsequent emergency room visit diagnosed Giertz with a noncancerous brain tumor—a 4.6-centimeter-wide, grade-1 meningioma—in her right eye. It had become swollen about a year earlier, but she had assumed it was an allergic reaction until it began aching. She soon named the tumor Brian, as an anagram of brain. She announced it in a five-minute YouTube video posted on April 30, one week after her diagnosis, titled, "I have a brain tumor." In this video, she both cried and made jokes about her diagnosis—including a joke about the tumor being the size of a golf ball while she "[doesn't] even like golf"—and she said that her "morbid sense of humor" was "the only way I know how to deal with this". It received over three million views within a few months. At the time of the video, she had over 900,000 subscribers on YouTube as well as 300,000 each on Twitter and Instagram.

In a tweet prior to her surgery, Giertz joked that she was sending an eviction notice to her tumor. Giertz posted a minute-long video at a hospital on the day of her surgery, on May 30, 2018. Giertz continued to post humorous and upbeat accounts of her post-surgery progress, including photos of her "super villain scar". Vlogger Charles Trippy, who had previously undergone brain surgery, replied that he and Giertz had "matching scars". After her recovery, Giertz resumed posting vlogs in July, and she set up a workshop in San Francisco in August. She sent a part of the removed tumor to Antarctica, posting a photo of it on Instagram on February 4, 2019. Although Giertz had cancelled an earlier project in Antarctica due to her health, the glass slide with her tumor was brought to Antarctica by her friend, documentarian Ariel Waldman, who placed it near Canada Glacier.

Giertz reported that her tumor had returned in a January 2019 tweet, followed by a YouTube video. It was in a part of her brain on which surgery was infeasible, so she was prescribed eight weeks of radiation therapy. She said in this video, "The campaign for 2018 with surgery was to evict Brian. And now, for 2019, we're going to burn Brian." She began selling t-shirts depicting her brain on Teespring. Discussing her health became the largest subject of her channel. As she said to The Washington Post in March 2019, this change "kind of pushed me to think of YouTube differently," and she began documenting various things that interested her beyond robots. By this time, she had reached over 1.5 million subscribers. After a course of radiation treatments, Giertz described her ordeal and presented a project which converted her head alignment mask into an artwork (a lamp) in May 2019.

==== Truckla ====
External videos
- I TURNED MY TESLA INTO A PICKUP TRUCK
- TRUCKLA: The world's first Tesla pickup truck

In June 2019, Giertz documented a project in which she and collaborators had converted a Tesla Model 3 into a pickup truck, which was named Truckla. The modifications were performed by her, Kampf, mechanic Marcos Ramirez, and YouTuber Rich Benoit, whose channel Rich Rebuilds often featured the modification of Teslas; several other friends were informally involved. She posted a 31-minute video describing the build process, which received eight million views within ten days. It was accompanied by a parody commercial directed by Jacquelyn Marker, with the slogan, "Available nowhere."

Giertz described Truckla as "the smartest or the most stupid thing I'm ever going to do." She built the truck in response to wanting both an electric vehicle to avoid having a gas car and a pickup truck for practical reasons. She did not want to wait for the proposed Tesla pickup that had been discussed for years. She explained that she was motivated by genuine interest:

My goal is to never own a gas car. I'm part of a new generation that will only drive electric. I feel like I should pad this a bit, but I'm not going to. Fuck oil companies. Seriously, fuck them.
...
I really hope that people don't just think of this as an obnoxious YouTuber cutting up a brand new car. This process has destructive steps but the end goal is constructive. And I'm doing it because I really, really want this car. This is truly my dream car.

— Press release by Simone Giertz

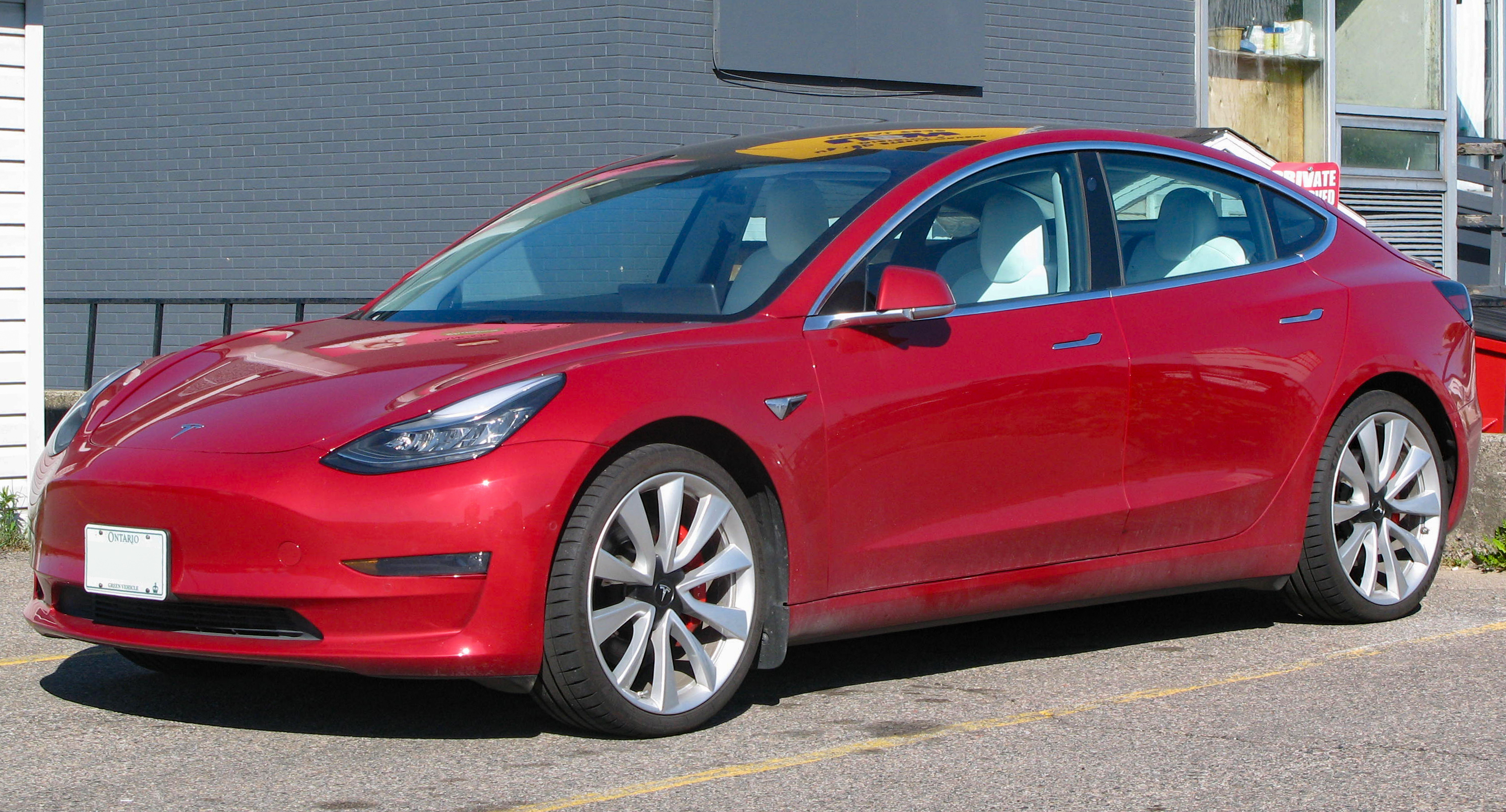
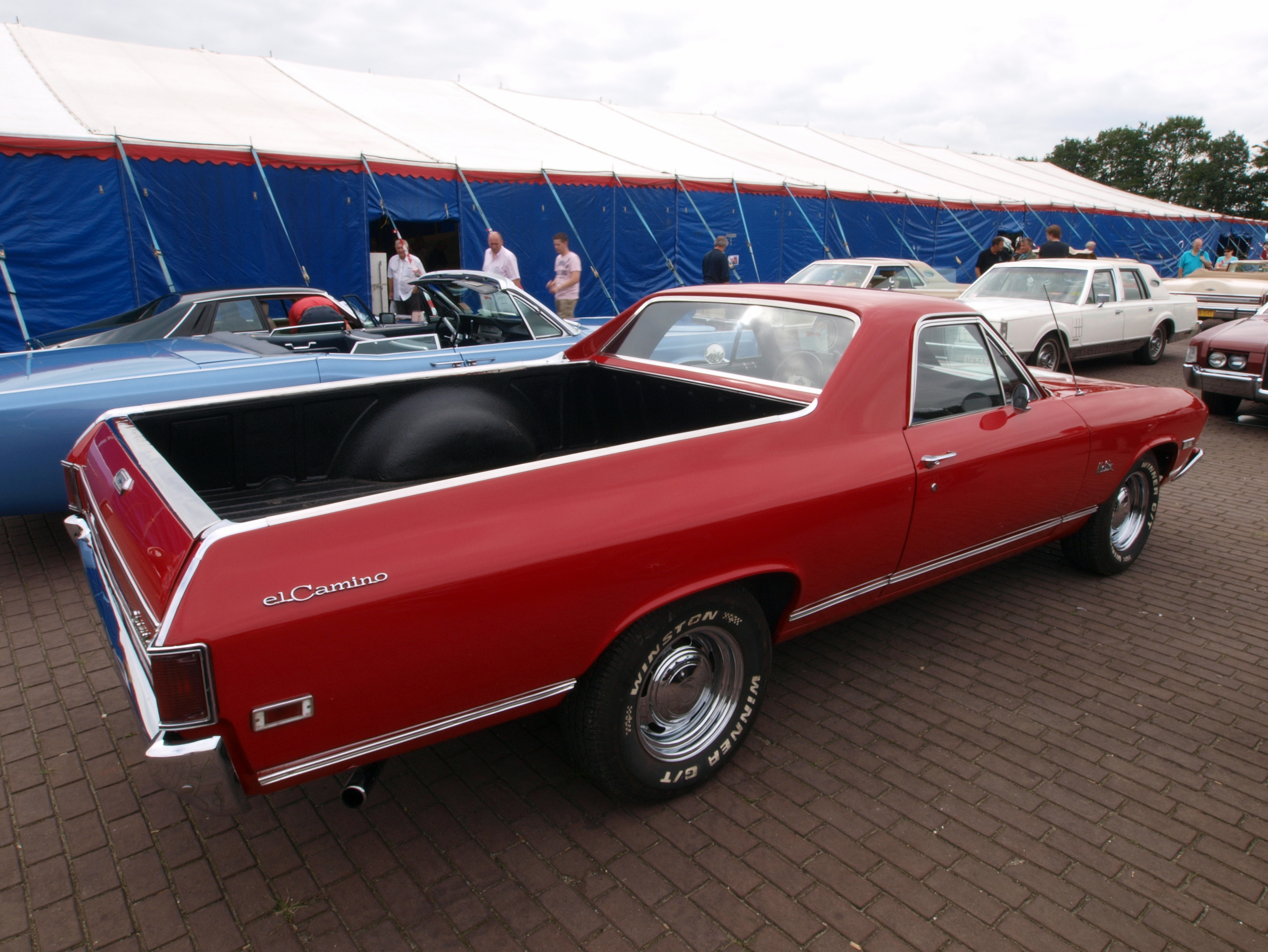
Giertz and collaborators modified a red Tesla Model 3 (left) to create Truckla. The final pickup truck resembled a Chevrolet El Camino (right).

Intending to complete the project in autumn 2018, Giertz's initial plan was to attach the front of a Tesla to a flatbed, but she chose a more complicated project to maintain the visual appeal of the car, which took a year of planning and design work. The final design resembled the Chevrolet El Camino. (Note: Giertz told Wired that she had "[tried] to build it into more of an El Camino truck". Sources including The Verge and Engadget described the final design as resembling this model.) Giertz worked on the project during her radiation treatments, which caused further delays. Giertz's team purchased a new Model 3, having decided it was the most feasible Tesla model to modify. They cut through the back of the car, removing the seats, roof, doors, windows, and gaskets, before welding it onto a flatbed from a Ford F-150 and a roof rack from a GMC Canyon. They had to hack into the car's programming as an anti-damage system prevented it from starting, and they had to add additional reinforcement. Although the final vehicle was functional, Giertz said it required additional work such as waterproofing and repainting. Giertz addressed Tesla CEO Elon Musk in the vlog, issuing a challenge for him to complete Tesla's official pickup truck, and saying, "Tweet at me, Elon. I'll give you a ride in Truckla."

Truckla received coverage in mainstream media sources and increased Giertz's fame. The project's style was different from her previous work; The Verge described it as "a whole new world of DIY", while Wired said her creation of a large, useful project was "a turning point". Musk watched the video, and Giertz was subsequently invited to the unveiling of Tesla's Cybertruck. In her video about the event, Giertz reacted to Musk's reveal of the truck with a shocked expression. Giertz posted another video on Truckla in March 2023—the fourth anniversary of the project—in which she took the truck to a workshop where Ramirez and Ross Huber finished work on the car, including making it watertight and completing the tailgate. The video also showed her developing a prototype for a charging station compatible with Truckla, in collaboration with Viam Labs, which she called Chargla.

==== Every Day Calendar ====
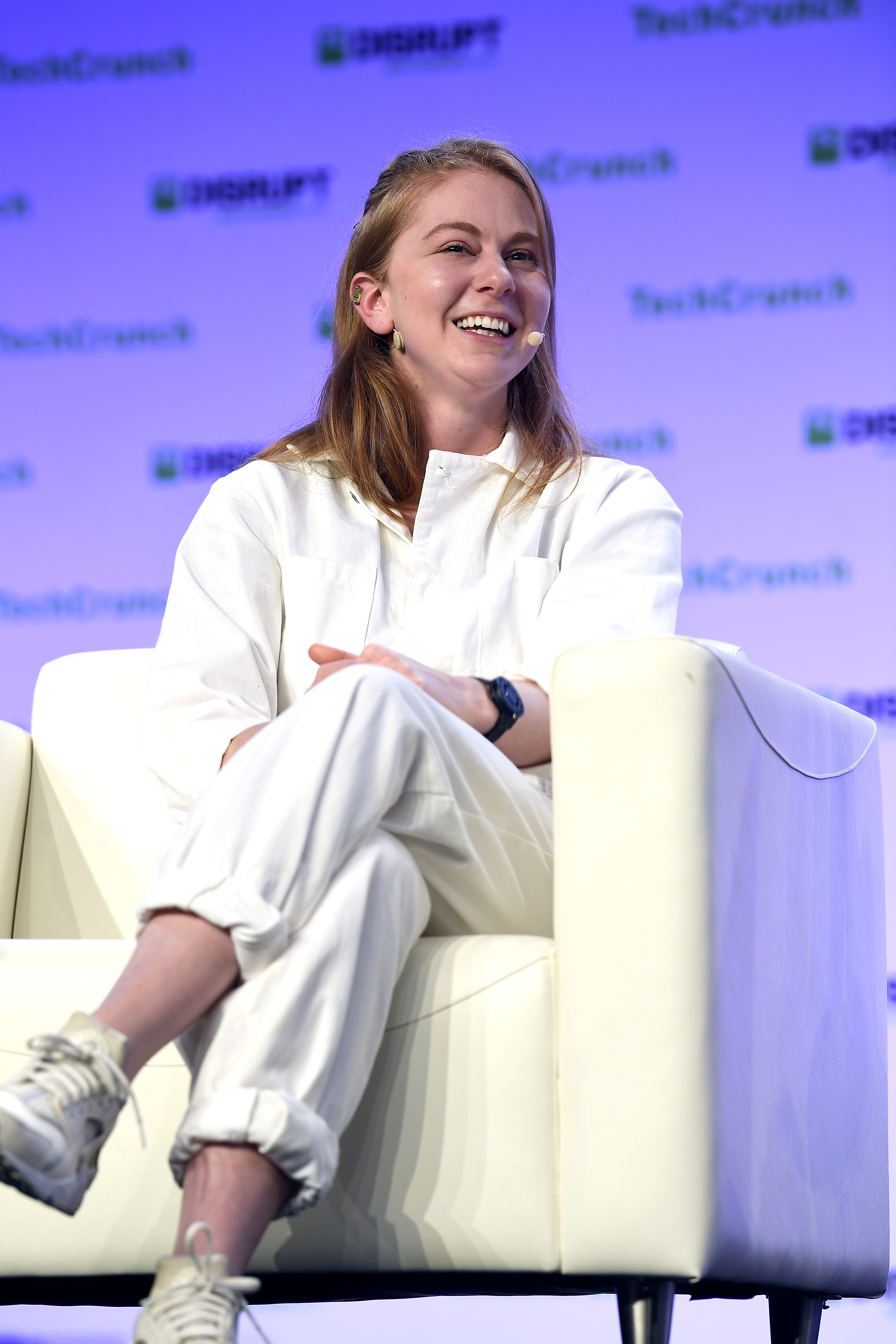
Simone Giertz talking at TechCrunch Disrupt in 2019

In a July 2019 Patreon post, Giertz stated that she had abandoned the concept of the "shitty robots" as it was no longer something she wanted to do and she felt that the joke had played out. As she shifted away from such work, Giertz began designing products to sell. She reflected in a June 2022 interview with Fast Company, "I'm a recovering self-deprecator. It's such a defense mechanism on the internet as well—like, the way you survive being an online creator is beating everyone to the joke and to the insult. I've been really trying to practice not talking myself down and talking down my skills." She was also motivated by a desire for her career not to depend on YouTube.

Giertz's first commercial release was the Every Day Calendar, a habit-tracking product designed by her and four collaborators. Giertz had originally built the project for herself, as she had begun engaging in meditation and yoga after her surgery and wanted to do these habits daily, before designing another version that could be sold at scale. It consisted of a wooden-framed printed circuit board with hexagonal capacitive sensing buttons that light up an LED for each day of the year. She launched a Kickstarter fundraising campaign for the calendar in October 2018; initially aiming to raise $35,000, she ultimately received $593,352 from over two thousand donors. She also published open-source schematics for the product to be made by others. Production began around December 2019. The product was later sold by other vendors, including the Museum of Modern Art Design Store.

==== Home-themed build videos and other appearances ====
Giertz was a Featured Creator at VidCon 2019 and was profiled in a Wired cover story in December 2019. Giertz featured vlogger Hannah Hart in a September 2019 video, in which the two attempted to eat a meal with a leaf blower blowing in their faces. In June 2020, Giertz voiced a cartoon robot named CGO in Adventure Time: Distant Lands. She also participated in a 2021 educational campaign by menstrual product company Kotex, making a mechanical model of menstruation.

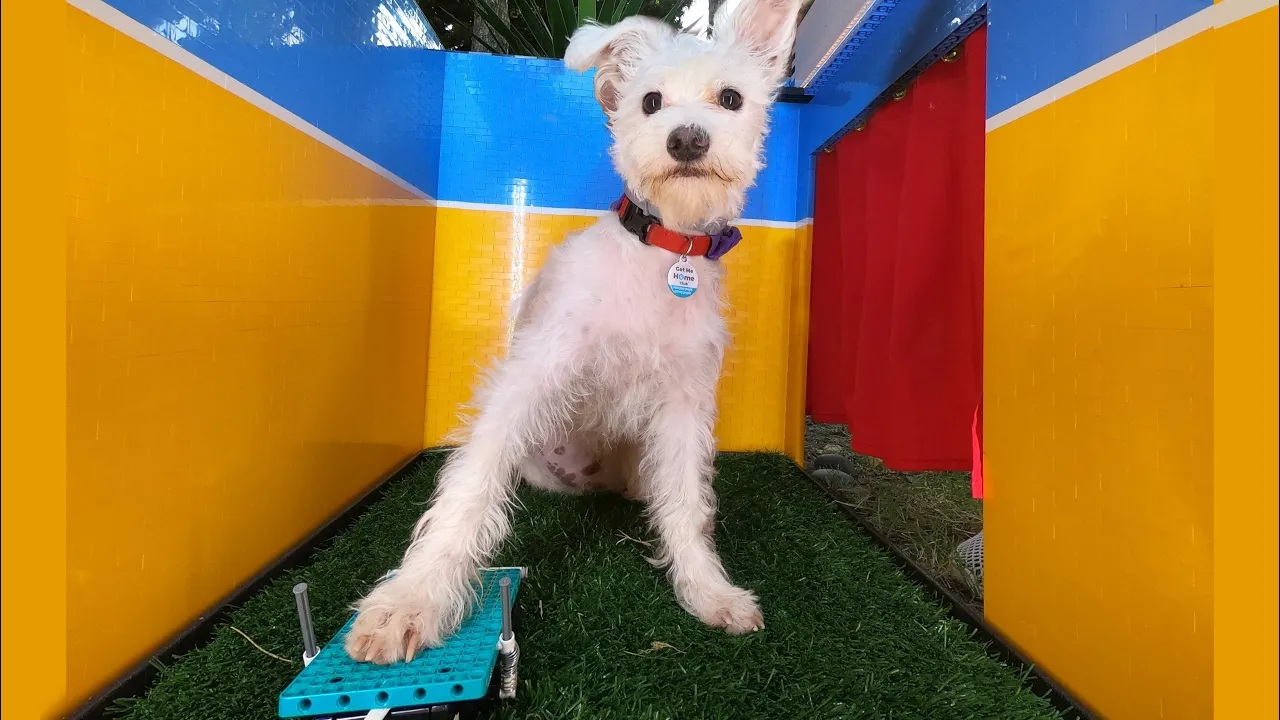
Giertz's dog, Scraps, in her dog photo booth

Giertz bought a house in Los Angeles in 2020, where she lives with her dog Scraps, a three-legged West Highland White Terrier born in 2019 or 2020. Several of her YouTube videos featured projects for her new house. In an October 2020 video sponsored by Lego, she used Lego Mindstorms pieces to construct a photo booth for Scraps, dispensing a dog treat whenever she pressed the button to take a photograph. A short version of the video on Giertz's Twitter account went viral, with over 100,000 likes. A March 2021 video documented her modelling and building a chair with a seat for Scraps to sit beside her, motivated by the dog's desire to sit on top of her. In September 2021, she built a table topped with tambour panels that could be rolled back to store jigsaw puzzle pieces inside.

=== Yetch Store (2022–present) ===
2025 logo of Yetch Store

In May 2022, Giertz started the Yetch Store, a product design company with an online shop. The company's name is a phonetic spelling of her surname. Yetch was announced in a YouTube video titled, "Is this the world's worst jigsaw puzzle". The video demonstrated the company's first product, the Incomplete White Puzzle, a completely white puzzle that appears to have one piece missing; she took nineteen hours to complete it. Upon the company's launch, it sold three other products: the Every Day Calendar as well as two rings, one with a screwdriver and one with a screw head. Giertz later made a YouTube video describing the difficulty of manufacturing and shipping these rings. In November 2023, Giertz led a Kickstarter campaign for a clothes hanger that folded to save space, called the Coat Hinger. The Kickstarter campaign earned over $60,000 and the product was sold on the Yetch Store.

In 2023 and 2024, Giertz's YouTube videos featured creations such as a robot arm made of stained glass, a box that shredded a message once opened, a pasta extruder made to resemble facial hair on a mannequin head, a hat that unzipped into a tote bag, a motorized skateboard made of Lego Technic parts for her dog to skateboard, and—in a collaboration with Kampf—a pair of safety goggles that functioned as a ruler. In a December 2024 Instagram Reel, Giertz showed a chair designed to rotate on a lazy Susan surrounded by a rack, allowing it to hold dirty clothing. After the chair went viral, Giertz stated plans to sell it as a Yetch product. In 2026 she created a Kickstarter for the laundry chair. During the 2025 Cairo Maker Faire, Giertz posted a collaboration with Dina Amin, altering a flip clock to track moon phases.

== Style ==
Combining maker videos with comedy, Giertz's videos frequently include swearing, deadpan humor, and self-deprecation. She has often worn jumpsuits and filmed in front of turquoise walls across multiple filming locations. Her videos are edited with frequent jump cuts, in addition to callout text, which is used to convey important phrases as well as jokes and inner thoughts.

Giertz releases videos without a regular schedule, with some being months apart. As of 2019, she also posts regularly on Patreon, which includes both videos and text posts. Giertz has described her audience as overwhelmingly male and mostly in the age range of 25 to 34. She told El País in 2018, "It's just as important for men to have women as role models."

Giertz's "shitty robot" videos employ deadpan humor to demonstrate mechanical robots of her own creation to automate everyday tasks; despite working from a purely mechanical standpoint, they often fall short of practical usefulness, for comic effect. When building her robots, Giertz would often not aim to make something useful, instead coming up with excessive solutions to potentially automatable situations. Aviva Rutkin of New Scientist compared Giertz's robots that intentionally failed with a widespread phenomenon of robots that were designed for serious tasks but failed. Giertz began each project with a sketch, followed by a computer model, before ordering materials. Several of her robots were made using a servomotor and an Arduino controller, including "The Wake-up Machine", "The Chopping Machine", and the shampoo robot. Giertz has said that her "shitty robot" videos had been a way to avoid her perfectionism and fear of failure.

As she shifted away from "shitty robots", Giertz described her content as a "journal of personal interest". She did not focus on educational value as she felt that such content was already done by other YouTubers. In Giertz's 2019 Wired profile, Lauren Goode noted that, despite Giertz's reputation for "shitty robots", her three most popular videos were more purpose-driven: the Truckla build, followed by the bathroom isolation and zero-gravity aircraft videos.

== Reception, analysis, and influence ==
Thomas Johnson of The Washington Post wrote that Giertz's appeal stems from a vicarious feeling of "pure delight", and that comments on her videos are "uncommonly wholesome". Johnson noted that Giertz contrasted with scientific presenters on mainstream media, as her humor was more profane, as well as with other science-themed YouTubers, as her video subjects were not based on learning. Writing for The Spectator in 2018, Ian Sansom called Giertz the best maker YouTuber, comparing her to cartoonist Heath Robinson as well as the character Wallace from Wallace and Gromit. BBC News's Patrick Evans also compared Giertz's robots to Wallace and Gromit.

In the 2019 Wired piece, Savage said of Giertz's early videos, "There's something so subversive and yet loving about technology at the same time". He also told Vice Magazine that Giertz was "her own subject matter ... Nobody else was in quite the same space." Quoted in a 2019 Washington Post article, YouTuber Dianna Cowern said Giertz had "an instinctual sense" for her creativity and humor. One of Giertz's creations, a musical instrument made of chattering teeth, inspired artist Love Hultén's 2020 creation of a similar instrument controlled by a synthesizer.

According to Eliza Strickland of IEEE Spectrum, Giertz's inventions exemplify economist Eric von Hippel's theory of user innovation, as they are designed for personal needs rather than business considerations. According to cultural theorist Cynthia Barounis, the "shitty robots" embody the ethos of the camp style, which finds artistic value in failure; Barounis writes that that the robots subvert the expectations of assistive technology, requiring Giertz to put work into something that does not help, and that they symbolize disability, being celebrated despite their inability to perform actions. According to technology writer Douglas Heaven, as well as historian Katia Pizzi, Giertz's work is the leading contemporary example of the useless machine, a type of artwork created by 20th-century artist Bruno Munari.

=== Awards and honors ===
Giertz was nominated for the Streamy Award in the Technology category in 2020, then in the Science and Engineering category in 2021 and 2022. Her Westworld collaboration was also nominated for the 2018 Streamy for Branded Content: Video. At the Streamy Awards, she was a finalist in the STEM category in 2017, and her Kotex marketing campaign received the Audience Honor Award in Education in 2022. Giertz has an honorary doctorate from the University of Skövde, received in 2025.
