= The Foo Show =

Virtual reality talk show

- Developer: Foo VR
- Creator: Will Smith
- Lead developer: Andre Infante
- Lead artist: Sindre Skaare
- Presented by: Will Smith
- Platforms: Oculus Rift, HTC Vive
- Released: April 2016 (Episode 0)
- Genre: Talk show
- Number of seasons: 1
- Number of episodes: 5

The Foo Show was an interactive virtual reality talk show developed by Foo VR and created by Will Smith. The first episode was released in April 2016.

Viewers watch the show through a compatible virtual reality headset and are able to move around and interact with the game world being discussed by the show's host and guests.

== Content ==
The show takes the format of a talk show where Smith and the episode's guests discuss, move around, and interact with a three dimensional space. Many of the episodes will be based on video games, but others will not. The player is free to move around the world and interact with the same models the guests are talking about while listening to the discussion. The host and guests record their movements through Virtual Reality headsets and controllers and are represented by low poly 3D models that move as they did in the real world while recording the episode.

== Development ==
Left: Will Smith and Brendon Chung recording an episode of The Foo Show live at XOXO Right: Their recording as seen by the viewer.

Smith announced in September 2015 that he was leaving Tested.com to start his own virtual reality company which would focus on "some different ways to communicate in VR", saying that he had come to find VR "captivating". Smith has said that he is interested in "figuring out the native language of VR storytelling" to create content that would be impossible in another format, and is open to trying a number of different styles with their developed technology, from non-interactive linear experiences to full adventure games. The show is produced through the use of HTC Vive headsets to capture the participants performances, and is planned to run on a weekly schedule.

In November 2016 Smith announced a Kickstarter campaign to fund the show's first, 5 episode, season for release in December, along with more episodes in January and February 2017.

== Episodes ==
=== Episode 0 ===
A player investigates a mug in the Firewatch tower in episode 0.

Released for free on April 2, 2016, Smith interviews Jake Rodkin and Sean Vanaman from Firewatch developer Campo Santo. After a short introduction, the viewer is transported inside the game's watchtower, where Smith, Rodkin, and Vanaman discuss aspects of the game's development and assets, interacting with the objects placed around the watchtower.

=== Season 1 ===
The developers were aiming for a December 2016 release for the show's first season. There are four released episodes in Season 1.

==== Episode 1 - Quadrilateral Cowboy ====
The first episode is an interview with Brendon Chung of Blendo Games discussing Quadrilateral Cowboy. The episode was recorded live at the 2016 XOXO festival.

==== Episode 2 - Total War: Warhammer II ====
Will dives into Total War: Warhammer II with Henry Hankin and Al Bickham of Creative Assembly, the developers of Total War: Warhammer II.

==== Episode 3 - Making Nanomachines from DNA ====
Will is joined by Shawn Douglas (a professor at UCSF whose research involves building nanomachines using DNA) and Jason Brown.

==== Episode 4 - Inside Adam Savage's Shop ====
Will takes a trip into Adam Savage's cave with Adam and Norman Chan from Tested.
