= Torx =

Screw drive with 6-lobed star-shaped flower-petal pattern

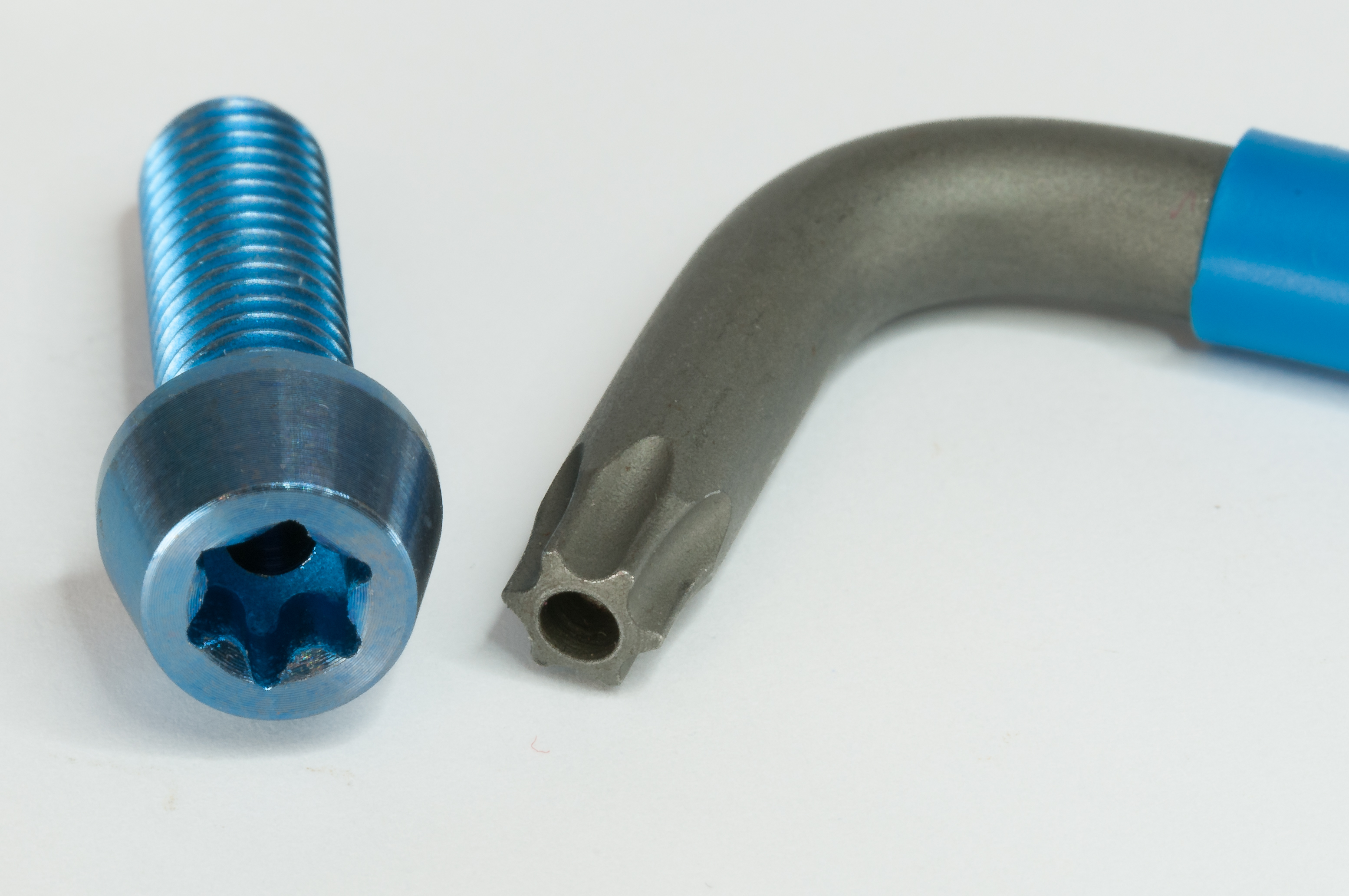
A security Torx L-key and fastener with holes for a safety pin to hinder disassembly with an ordinary Torx key.

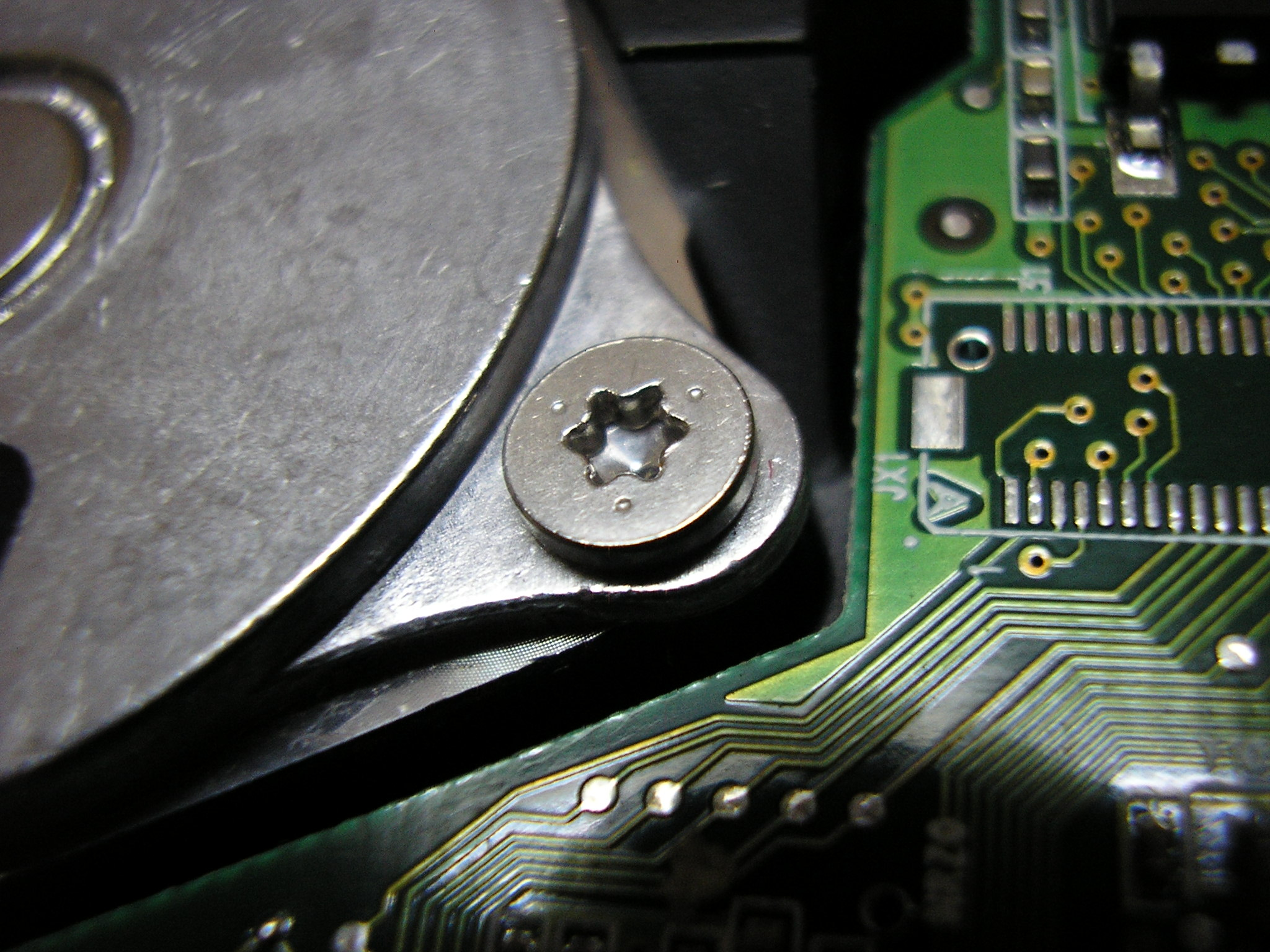
A Torx T8 screw head on a hard disk drive.

Torx (pronounced /tɔːrks/) is a brand of screw drive characterized by a 6-point star-shaped pattern, developed in 1967 by Camcar Textron. (Note: Camcar eventually became part of Textron Fastening Systems in the 1990s. In 2006 Textron Fastening Systems was sold to Platinum Equities, LLC, of Beverly Hills, California. They renamed the company Acument Global Technologies, which as of 2010 includes Avdel, Camcar, Ring Screw, and others. In 2014, Acument was sold from Platinum Equity to Fontana Gruppo.) A popular generic name for the drive is star, as in star screwdriver or star bits. The official generic name, standardized by the International Organization for Standardization as ISO 10664, is hexalobular internal. This is sometimes abbreviated in databases and catalogs as 6lobe (starting with the numeral 6, not the capital letter G). Torx Plus, Torx Paralobe, and Torx ttap are improved head profiles.

Torx screws are commonly found on automobiles, motorcycles, bicycle brake systems (disc brakes), hard disk drives, computer systems, and consumer electronics. Initially, they were sometimes used in applications requiring tamper resistance, since the drive systems and screwdrivers were not widely available. However, as torx drivers became more common, tamper-resistant variants, as described below, were developed. Torx screws are also becoming increasingly popular in construction industries.

== Principles of operation ==
The angle between the plane of contact between tool and fastener and the circumferentially directed force is much closer to 90° in a Torx type of head (lower) than in a conventional hex head (upper). (Exaggerated for illustrational purposes)

By design, Torx head screws resist cam out better than Phillips head or slot head screws. Whereas the tendency of Phillips drivers to cam out under excessive torque has been listed as a feature preventing damage to the screw-head or driver, Torx heads were designed to prevent cam-out. The development of better torque-limiting automatic screwdrivers for use in factories allowed this change. Rather than rely on the tool to slip out of the screw head when a desired torque level is reached (which risks damage to the driver tip, screw head, or workpiece), torque-limiting driver designs achieve a desired torque consistently.

The Torx design allows for a higher torque to be exerted than a similarly sized conventional hex socket head without damaging the head or the tool. The diagram depicts the interaction between the male and female components of a conventional hex drive and a Torx drive. The clearance between the components is exaggerated for clarity.

The green circle, passing through the six points of contact between the two components, represents the direction of the rotational force being exerted at each of those points. Because the plane of contact is not perpendicular to this circle, a radial force is also generated which tends to "burst" the female component and "crush" the male one. If this radial force component is too great for the material to withstand, it will cause the corners to be rounded off one or both components or will split the sides of the female part. The magnitude of this force is proportional to the cotangent of the angle (depicted in orange) between the green circle and the contact plane.

For the Torx type of design, the angle is much closer to 90° than in the case of the hex head, and so for a given torque the potentially damaging radial force is much lower. This property allows the head of the fastener to be smaller for the same required torque, which can be an advantage in applications where space to accommodate the head is limited.

== Sizing ==
Torx head sizes are described using the capital letter "T" followed by a number ranging from T1 to T100. Some manufacturers and resellers head sizes are also described using "TX" or "Tx" in front of the number. A smaller number corresponds to a smaller point-to-point dimension of the screw head (diameter of the circle containing everything in the cross-section of the driver's tip; longest distance between two opposite points on the tip). Common sizes include T10, T15, and T25, while T35 and T47 tend to see specialized use. Only the proper driver can drive a specific head size without risk of damaging the driver or screw. The same series of Torx drivers is used to drive SAE, metric and other thread system fasteners, reducing the number of bit sizes required.

The "external" variants of Torx head sizes (see below) are described using the capital letter "E" followed by a number ranging from E4 to E44. The "E" numbers are different from the "T" numbers of the same size: for example, an E4 Torx socket fits a T20 head.

Properties of various Torx drives
| Size | Point-to-point distance | | Maximum torque range | | ~ E Torx |
| Size | (in) | (mm) | (lb·ft) | (N·m) | ~ E Torx |
|---|---|---|---|---|---|
| T1 | 0.035 | 0.90 | 0.015–0.022 | 0.02–0.03 | |
| T2 | 0.039 | 1.00 | 0.052–0.066 | 0.07–0.09 | |
| T3 | 0.047 | 1.20 | 0.10–0.13 | 0.14–0.18 | |
| T4 | 0.053 | 1.35 | 0.16–0.21 | 0.22–0.28 | |
| T5 | 0.059 | 1.50 | 0.32–0.38 | 0.43–0.51 | E2 |
| T6 | 0.069 | 1.75 | 0.55–0.66 | 0.75–0.90 | |
| T7 | 0.083 | 2.10 | 1.0–1.3 | 1.4–1.7 | |
| T8 | 0.094 | 2.40 | 1.6–1.9 | 2.2–2.6 | |
| T9 | 0.102 | 2.60 | 2.1–2.5 | 2.8–3.4 | |
| T10 | 0.110 | 2.80 | 2.7–3.3 | 3.7–4.5 | |
| T15 | 0.132 | 3.35 | 4.7–5.7 | 6.4–7.7 | |
| T20 | 0.156 | 3.95 | 7.7–9.4 | 10.5–12.7 | E4 |
| T25 | 0.177 | 4.50 | 11.7–14.0 | 15.9–19 | E5 |
| T27 | 0.201 | 5.10 | 16.6–19.8 | 22.5–26.9 | |
| T30 | 0.220 | 5.60 | 22.9–27.6 | 31.1–37.4 | E6 |
| T35 | 0.232 | 5.90 | | | E7 |
| T40 | 0.266 | 6.75 | 39.9–48.0 | 54.1–65.1 | E8 |
| T45 | 0.312 | 7.93 | 63.4–76.1 | 86–103.2 | |
| T47 | GM-Style | | | | |
| T50 | 0.352 | 8.95 | 97–117 | 132–158 | E10 |
| T55 | 0.447 | 11.35 | 161–189 | 218–256 | E12 |
| T60 | 0.530 | 13.45 | 280–328 | 379–445 | E16 |
| T70 | 0.618 | 15.70 | 460–520 | 630–700 | E18 |
| T80 | 0.699 | 17.75 | 696–773 | 943–1,048 | E20 |
| T90 | 0.795 | 20.20 | 984–1,094 | 1,334–1,483 | |
| T100 | 0.882 | 22.40 | 1,359–1,511 | 1,843–2,048 | E24 |

== Variants ==
Although the brand "Torx" generally refers to the standard 6-star-driver or -socket, there are many variations to the original design, including a number made or licensed by Torx. Other tool manufacturers have been producing 8-, 10- and 12-point star drivers and sockets for many decades. The Torx brand is often used universally to describe these and other star driver variations.

=== Security Torx ===
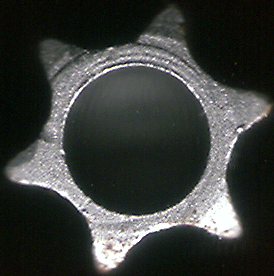
Security Torx driver

A version known as Security Torx, Tamper-Resistant Torx (often shortened to Torx TR) or pin-in Torx contains a post in the center of the head that prevents a standard Torx driver from being inserted. However, the pin allows a smaller flat head screw driver to be used successfully between two adjacent lobes.

Security Torx has its own set of variations, and many other variations of Torx drives are available in Security or TR versions. These include five- and seven-lobed TR heads.

=== Torx Paralobe ===
Torx Paralobe head pattern

Torx Paralobe is a further developed Torx Drive System with 6% longer flanks which results in 20% more torque than Torx Plus and 50% more torque than Torx.

=== Torx Plus ===
Torx Plus head pattern

A Torx successor, Torx Plus, was introduced around 1990 when the original Torx patent was expiring. The Torx Plus patent subsequently expired in 2011. The lobes are more square to allow for higher torque and to minimize wear. The name is shortened to IP (Internal Plus) with sizes ranging from 1IP to 100IP (sometimes listed as IP1 to IP100) and EP (External Plus) with sizes ranging from 1EP to 42EP as well as smaller sizes ranging from H7EP to H2EP and includes five-lobed tamper-resistant variants. The specifications for these licenses are held by Textron. Standard Torx drivers can be used to drive Torx Plus screws, but not to full torque because of the loose fit. Torx Plus drivers will not fit into standard Torx screws.

- A tamper-resistant version of Torx Plus exists having five lobes rather than six, plus a solid post in the center, and is used for security as the drivers are uncommon. Though Acument (formerly Textron) lists no designation, TS or IPR may be seen.
- Torx Plus Maxx Stems is a highly specialized variant used on the ends of fasteners opposite the bolt-head, and provides higher torque than other drive systems allow. Torxstem is a stud with the Torx Plus Maxx drive on both ends.

=== Torx ttap ===
Torx Ttap head pattern

A proprietary version of Torx called Torx ttap was developed in 2006 and is licensed by Acument Intellectual Properties. It features a second recess to create a "stick-fit" engagement (branded Frixion Fit), designed to minimize wobbling (branded Stable Drive) without pressing and the need for magnetic bits, a feature that can be important to certain industrial users. Standard Torx drivers can be used to drive Torx ttap screws, but Torx ttap drivers will not fit standard Torx screws.

=== AudiTorx ===
AudiTorx is a tamper-proof fastener where a convex and smooth fastener head is topped with a break-away Torx drive that snaps off when the engineered torque is reached, leaving a rivet-like bolt head that cannot be easily removed. The main application for these fasteners is in the railroad industry.

=== External (inverted) Torx ===
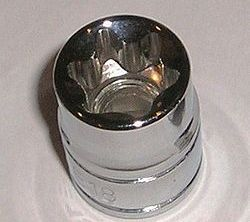
External Torx driver

An External Torx version exists, also known as Inverted Torx, where the screw head has the shape of a Torx screwdriver bit, and a Torx socket is used to drive it. The external "E" Torx nominal sizing does not correlate to the "T" size, (e.g. an E40 socket is too large to fit a T40 Torx bit, while an E8 Torx socket will fit a T40 Torx bit).

Properties of various External Torx drives
| Size | Point-to-point distance | | Standard fastener selection | |
| Size | (in) | (mm) | SAE | Metric |
|---|---|---|---|---|
| E4 | 0.15 | 3.8 | #6 | M3 |
| E5 | 0.19 | 4.7 | #8 | M4 |
| E6 | 0.22 | 5.6 | #10 | M5 |
| E7 | 0.24 | 6.1 | | |
| E8 | 0.29 | 7.4 | 1/4" | M6 & M7 |
| E10 | 0.37 | 9.3 | 5/16" | M8 |
| E12 | 0.44 | 11.1 | 3/8" | M10 & M11 |
| E14 | 0.50 | 12.8 | 7/16" | M12 |
| E16 | 0.58 | 14.7 | 1/2" | |
| E18 | 0.65 | 16.6 | 9/16" | M14 |
| E20 | 0.72 | 18.4 | 5/8" | M16 |
| E24 | 0.87 | 22.1 | 3/4" | M18 & M20 |
| E28 | | | 7/8" | M22 |
| E32 | | | 1" | M24 & M27 |
| E36 | | | 1-1/8" | M30 |
| E40 | | | 1-1/4" | M33 |
| E44 | | | 1-3/8" | M36 |

== Competitive variants ==
AW drive is a hexalobular-type screw head similar to Torx, with a tapered profile to aid in centering, developed by the Würth Group in Germany. It is available in five sizes: AW 10, AW 20, AW 25, AW 30 and AW 40.

T-Star plus has a similar screw drive design to Torx ttap and was introduced in 2005 by German fastener manufacturer Altenloh, Brinck & Co under its brand name Spax.

== Gallery ==
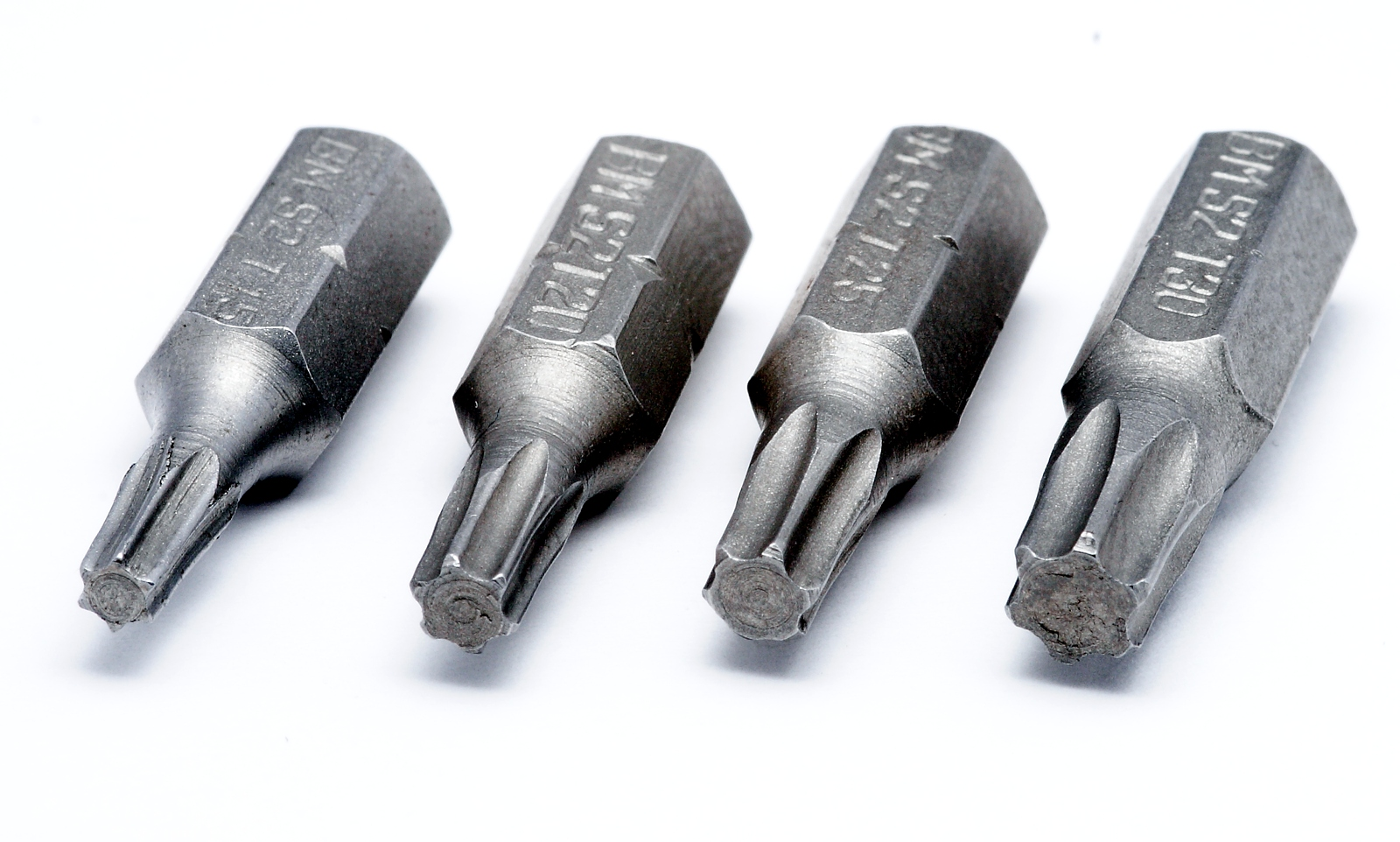
Torx bits T15, T20, T25, and T30

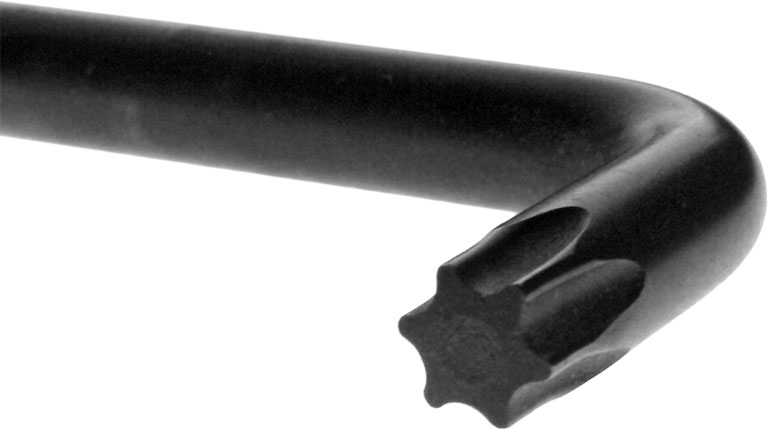
A Torx wrench

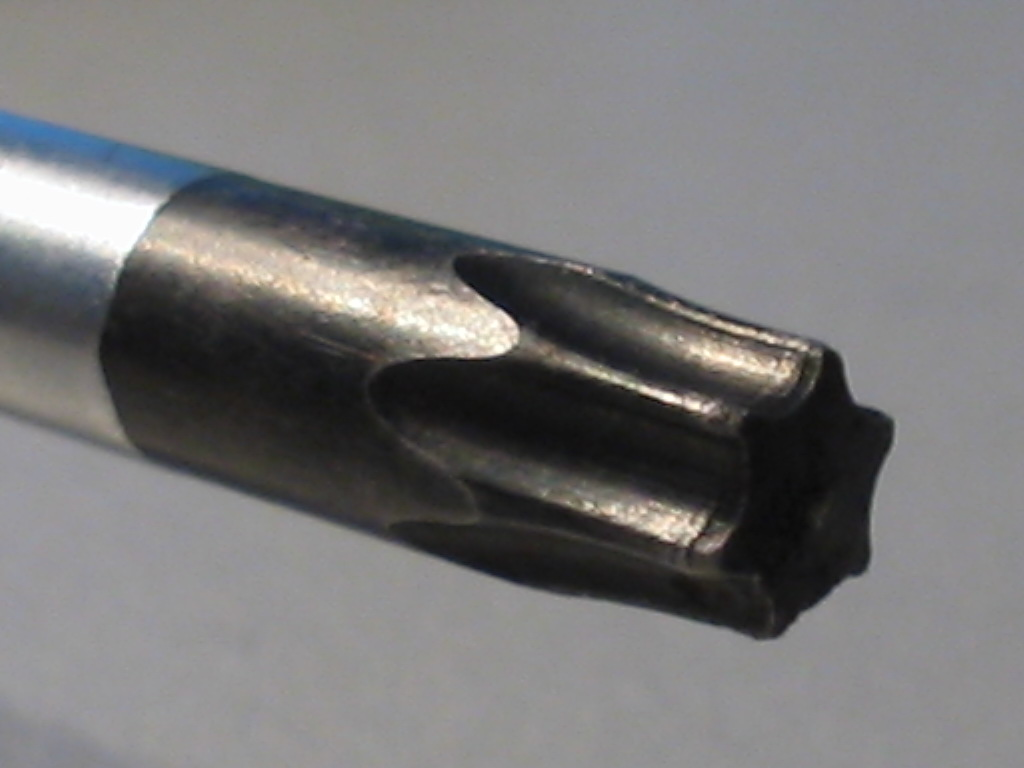
Closeup of Torx screwdriver tip

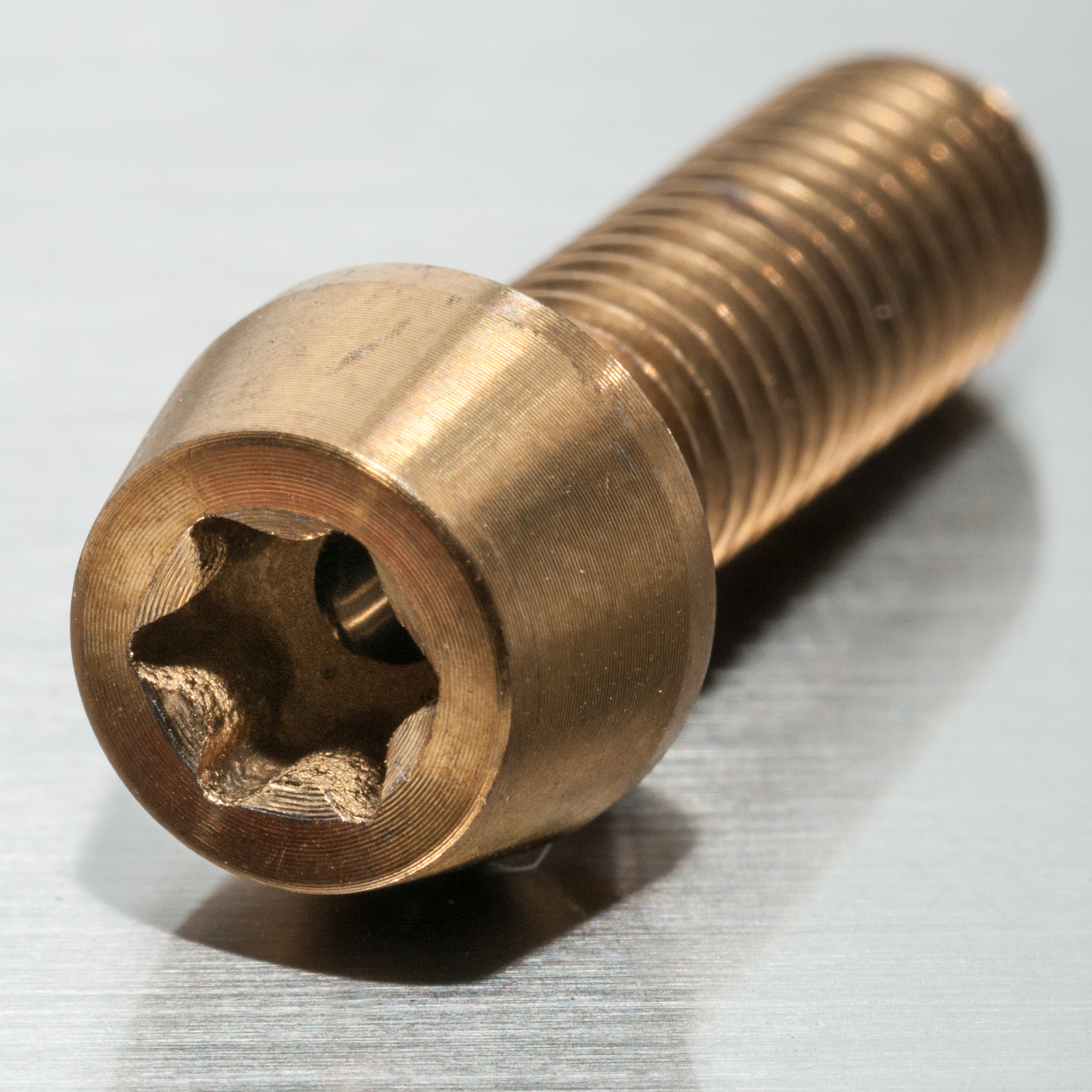
A Torx T30 bolt

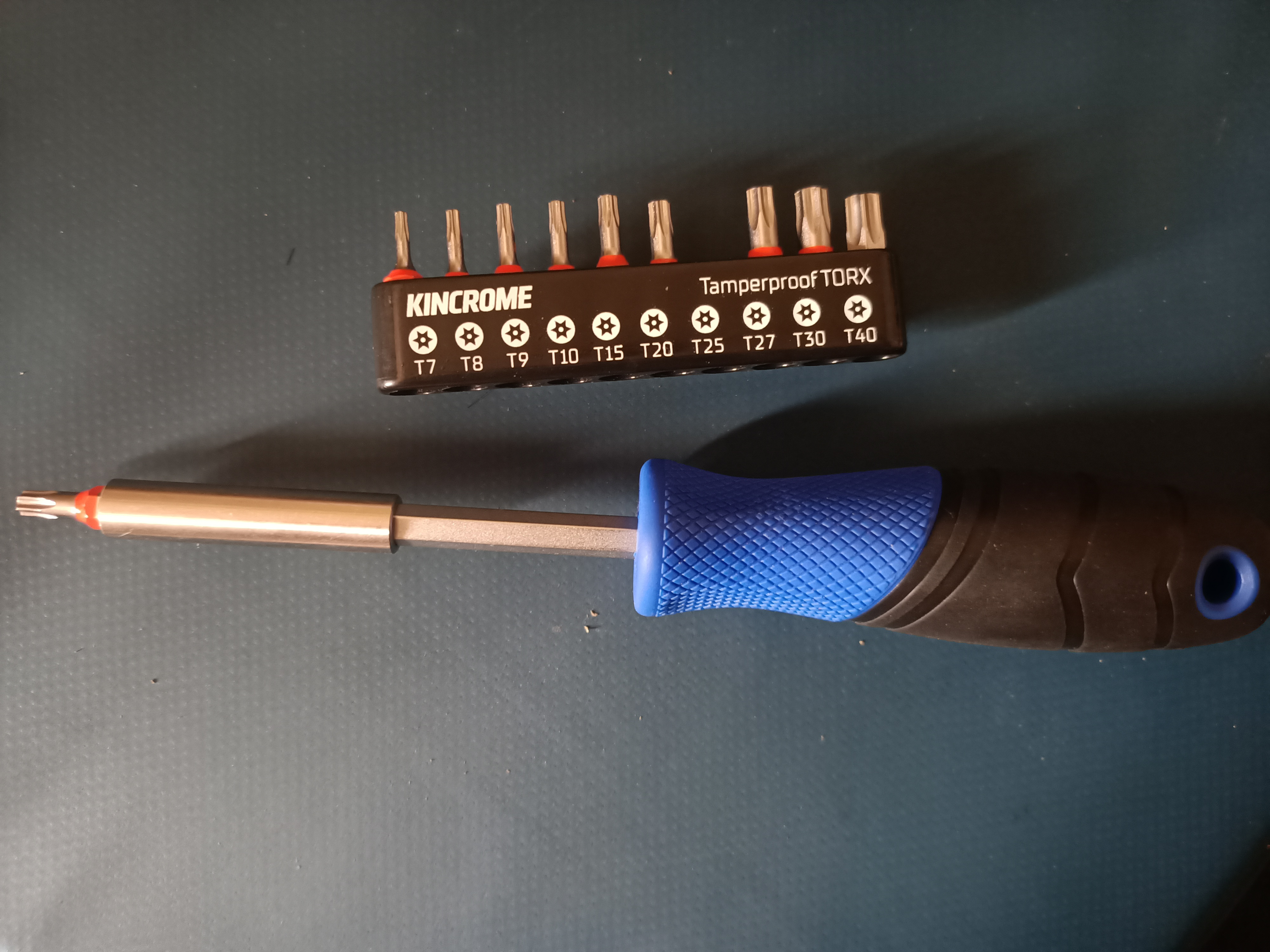
A Torx screwdriver with a set of interchangeable Torx bits

== See also ==
- List of screw drives
- Wrench
