= Corinne Brinkerhoff =

American television writer and producer

- Born: Corinne Noel Brinkerhoff; 1979 (age 46–47); Lawrence, Kansas, United States
- Education: Boston University College of Communication; Truman State University
- Occupations: Television producer, writer
- Years active: 2006–present
- Television: The Good Wife, Boston Legal

Corinne Noel Brinkerhoff (born 1979) is an American television writer and producer. She has worked on the series The Good Wife and Boston Legal. She was nominated for a Writers Guild of America Award for best new series in 2010.

== Background ==
Brinkerhoff was born in Lawrence, Kansas, and graduated from Lawrence High School. She is an alumna of Truman State University, initially majoring in aerospace engineering, with a minor in creative writing. She changed majors, graduated, and took graduate studies at the Boston University College of Communication.

== Career ==
=== Boston Legal ===
Brinkerhoff began working in television in 2004 as the executive assistant to showrunner David E. Kelley on Boston Legal. She became a writer in 2006, writing nine episodes in the entire series' run. In 2007, she became a story editor and was promoted to executive story editor in 2008.

=== The Good Wife ===
She became a co-producer and writer for new legal drama The Good Wife in 2009, writing 10 episodes over the course of 67 episodes produced. Brinkerhoff and the writing team were nominated for the Writers Guild of America Award for best new television series in 2010 for their work on the first season of The Good Wife.

=== Elementary to present ===
From 2012 to 2013, Brinkerhoff was co-executive producer for the television series Elementary, writing three episodes and a teleplay for another. In 2014, she was co-executive producer for the short-lived series Reckless, writing one episode. She wrote an unnamed pilot episode before becoming co-executive producer and writer for the television series Jane the Virgin from 2014 to 2015.

In 2016, she created the series American Gothic, of which she was showrunner, executive producer and writer. She was also executive producer for the series No Tomorrow, which debuted in 2016.

== Personal life ==
Brinkerhoff is married to Laura Kampf.

== Filmography ==
Year	Work	Producer	Writer	Notes
2006–08	Boston Legal		Yes	Story editor
2009–12	The Good Wife	Yes	Yes	Nominated – Primetime Emmy Award for Outstanding Drama Series (2011); Nominated – Writers Guild of America Award for New Series (2010); Nominated – WGA Award for Dramatic Series (2012)
2012–13	Elementary	Yes	Yes	
2014	Identity		Yes	TV pilot
2014	Reckless	Yes	Yes	
2014–15	Jane the Virgin	Yes	Yes	
2016	American Gothic	Yes	Yes	Series creator
2016	No Tomorrow	Yes	Yes	Series developer
2020	Miss Farah		Yes	Arabic-language remake of Jane the Virgin
