= Caroline Giertz =

Swedish television presenter

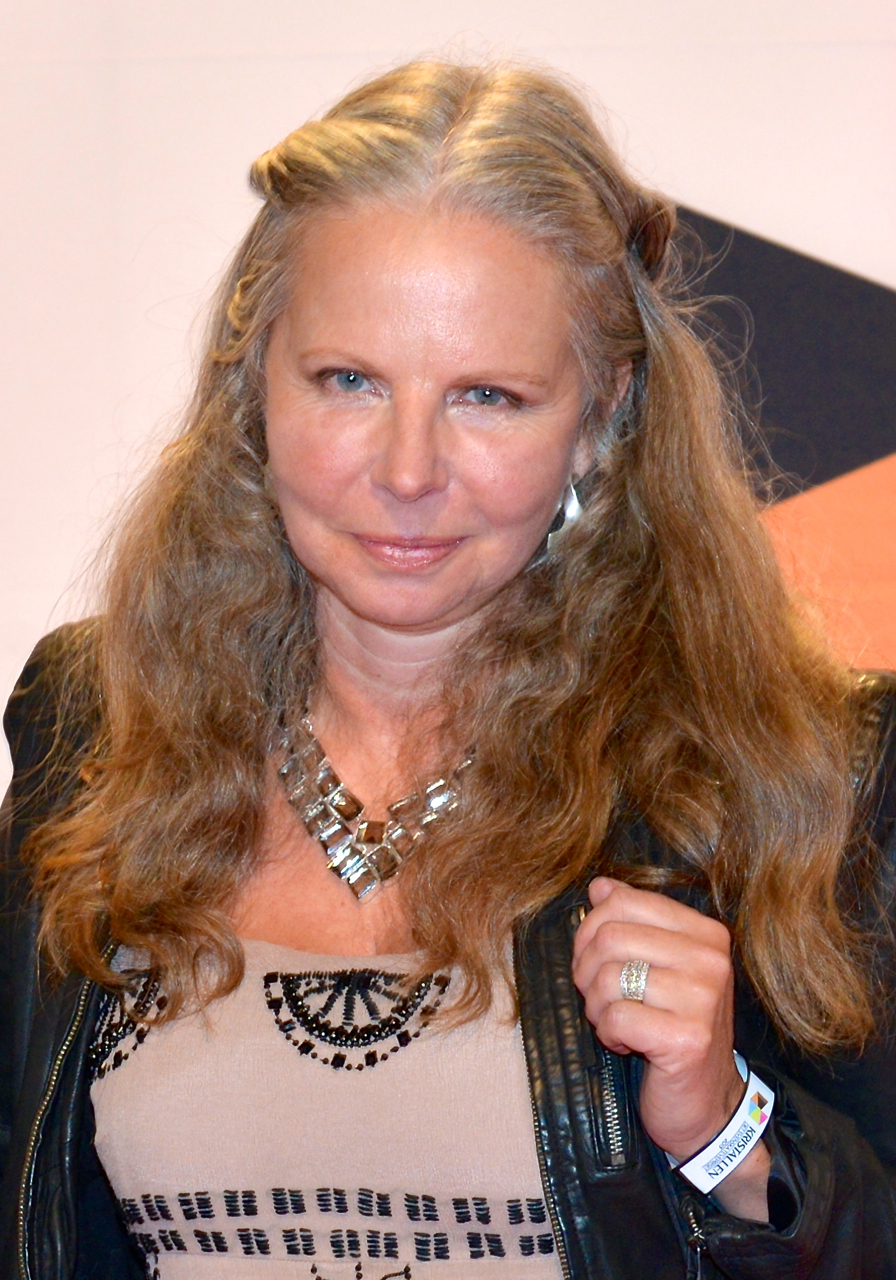
- Giertz in 2013
- Born: Elsa Caroline Giertz; 26 May 1958 (age 68); Stockholm, Sweden
- Occupations: Television presenter, Author
- Children: Simone Giertz

Elsa Caroline Giertz (born 26 May 1958) is a Swedish author and television presenter. From 1996 to 1998, Giertz hosted news panel show Måndagsklubben, broadcast on Swedish channel Kanal 5, and is also known for hosting paranormal show Det Okända, broadcast on TV4 and Sjuan between 2006 and 2019. Giertz is also an author and has published several books since the 1990s.

== Personal life ==
Giertz is the granddaughter of architect Lars Magnus Giertz, and niece of his brother Bo Giertz, who was a bishop. Her great great grandfather, Lars Magnus Ericsson, was the founder of telecommunications manufacturer Ericsson, and author Martin Giertz is her second cousin once removed. Giertz and her partner, television producer Nicola Söderlund, had one daughter, Simone Giertz, who is a popular inventor and YouTube creator.

In a 2012 interview, Giertz said that she had been diagnosed with ADHD, which she suspects has influenced her fondness for building and decorating.

== Bibliography ==
- Stor (1993) Normal publishers (pocket 2007)
- Ashimas Bok (2006) Normal publishers
- 24 Timmar I Oktober (2007) Normal publishers
- Den Sista Dagen (2008) Normal publishers
