= Rich Benoit =

American YouTuber

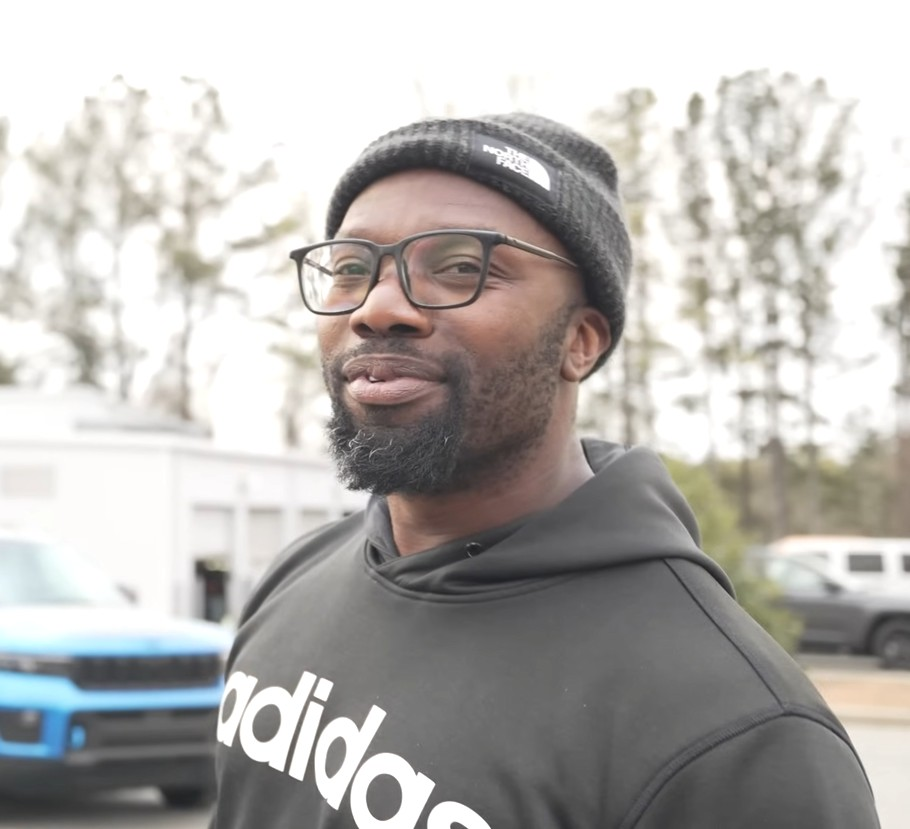
- Education: Harvard University

YouTube information
- Channel: Rich Rebuilds
- Years active: 2016–present
- Subscribers: 1.78 million
- Views: 250 million
- Last updated: June 08, 2026

Richard Benoit is an American car enthusiast known for his YouTube car vlog co-founded by Rich Benoit & Carl Hewitt, where he and members of his crew rebuild Tesla cars, create electric vehicles, and rebuild custom cars, called Rich Rebuilds. Benoit has been an outspoken critic for the Right to Repair on Teslas, and has spoken of Tesla's refusal to grant car service or parts to him for the purpose of repairing his used Model S. Benoit currently has an automobile repair shop called the "Electrified Garage" in New Hampshire, in addition to one in Ocala, Florida.

== Biography ==
Benoit grew up in the Boston neighborhood of Mattapan as the child of immigrants from Trinidad and Tobago.

At age seven he developed an interest in repairing objects. His father was an electrical engineer, often bringing back fake Rolexes from work trips for him to work on. His interest later grew to include household items and his mother's Geo Metro. He later rebuilt a Honda CBR600RR motorcycle and a Chrysler 300C SRT8.

After dropping out from Harvard University, Benoit started his professional career working in IT in Boston's Financial District. In 2014, he sold his Chrysler and purchased a Chevrolet Corvette Z06. Shortly after, a friend showed him his newly purchased Tesla Model S, which sparked Benoit's interest in the vehicles. Unable to afford a running and driving one, he bought a flood damaged Model S for $14,000, which he named "Delores". When attempting to purchase parts from Tesla, he was told no, and decided to buy a second damaged car with front end damage to use as a parts donor. Originally documenting his progress on repairing the car on a forum, after being bombarded with racist reactions, he started uploading videos to YouTube in 2016.

In late 2018, Benoit partnered with Chris Salvo to open a repair shop. Chris Salvo founded EV Tuning, an online electric vehicle (EV) parts store. In 2019, they began construction on Electrified Garage, located in Seabrook, New Hampshire. Another shop opened in Ocala, Florida in 2020.

Benoit published his memoir, Going Fast and Fixing Things in June, 2024.

== YouTube channel ==
As of 2024, Benoit's YouTube channel, Rich Rebuilds, had nearly 1.5 million subscribers and over 217 million views. He is known to his followers as "Uncle Rich" and "the Doctor Frankenstein of Teslas."

== Right to repair ==
Benoit has advocated for the right to repair vehicles following his experience in attempting to purchase parts for his rebuilds. Benoit has stated he found Tesla's policy to not allow unlicensed owners to purchase parts counter to the company's goals of sustainability, according to Vice. Benoit and others have fought against large vehicle manufacturers in order to expand right to repair laws, resulting in Massachusetts citizens voting to expand in November 2020 by an overwhelming margin. In a 2024 article by InsideHook, Benoit took credit for Tesla's change in policies regarding parts sales and repair, saying "Tesla allows pretty much everything now." Benoit started a Facebook group dedicated to people who want to buy or sell Tesla parts. As of 2024, the group had over 33,000 members.
