= Altenloh, Brinck & Co =

German group of companies for fastening and plastics engineering

Altenloh, Brinck & Co – Group
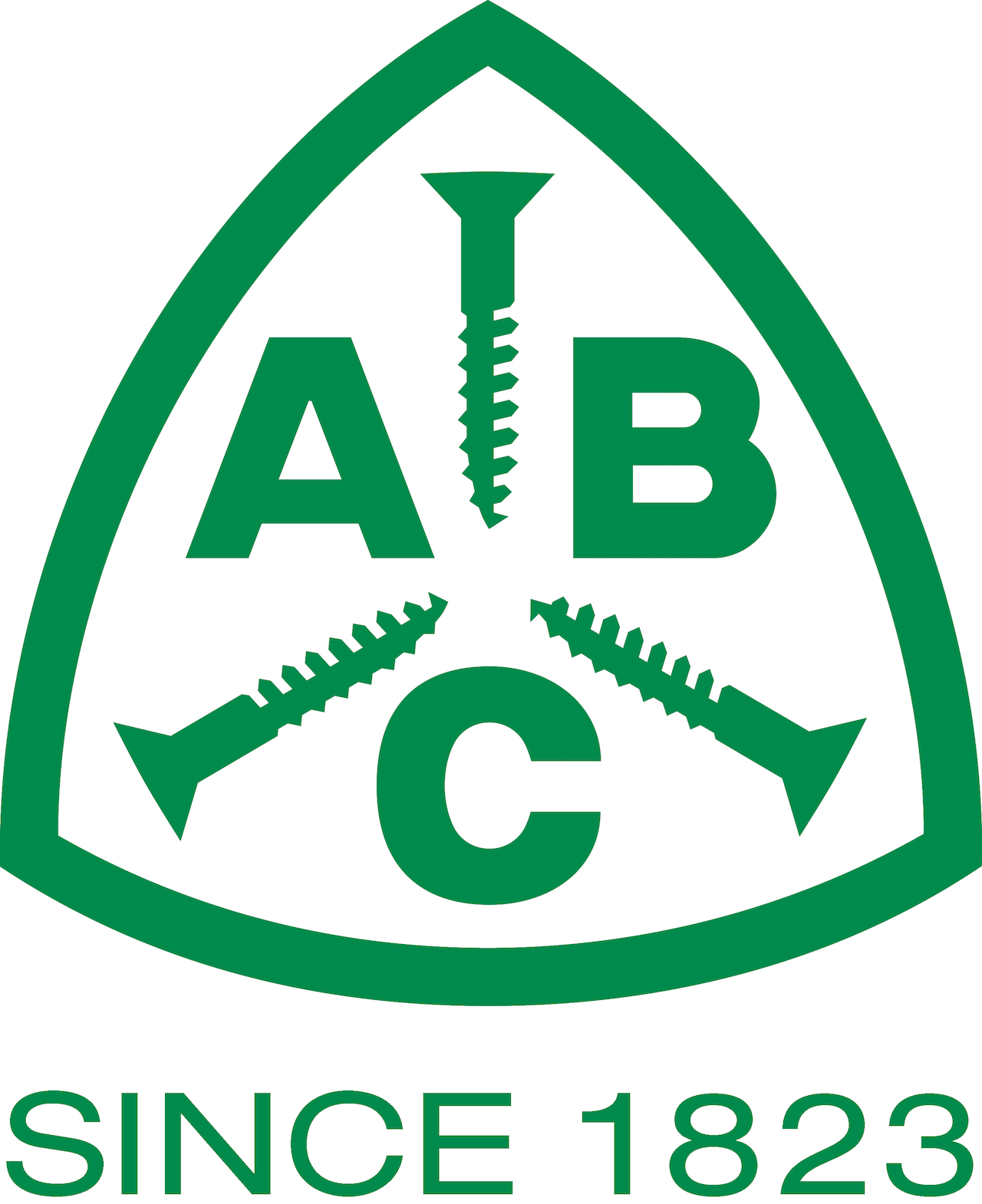
- Altenloh, Brinck & Co logo

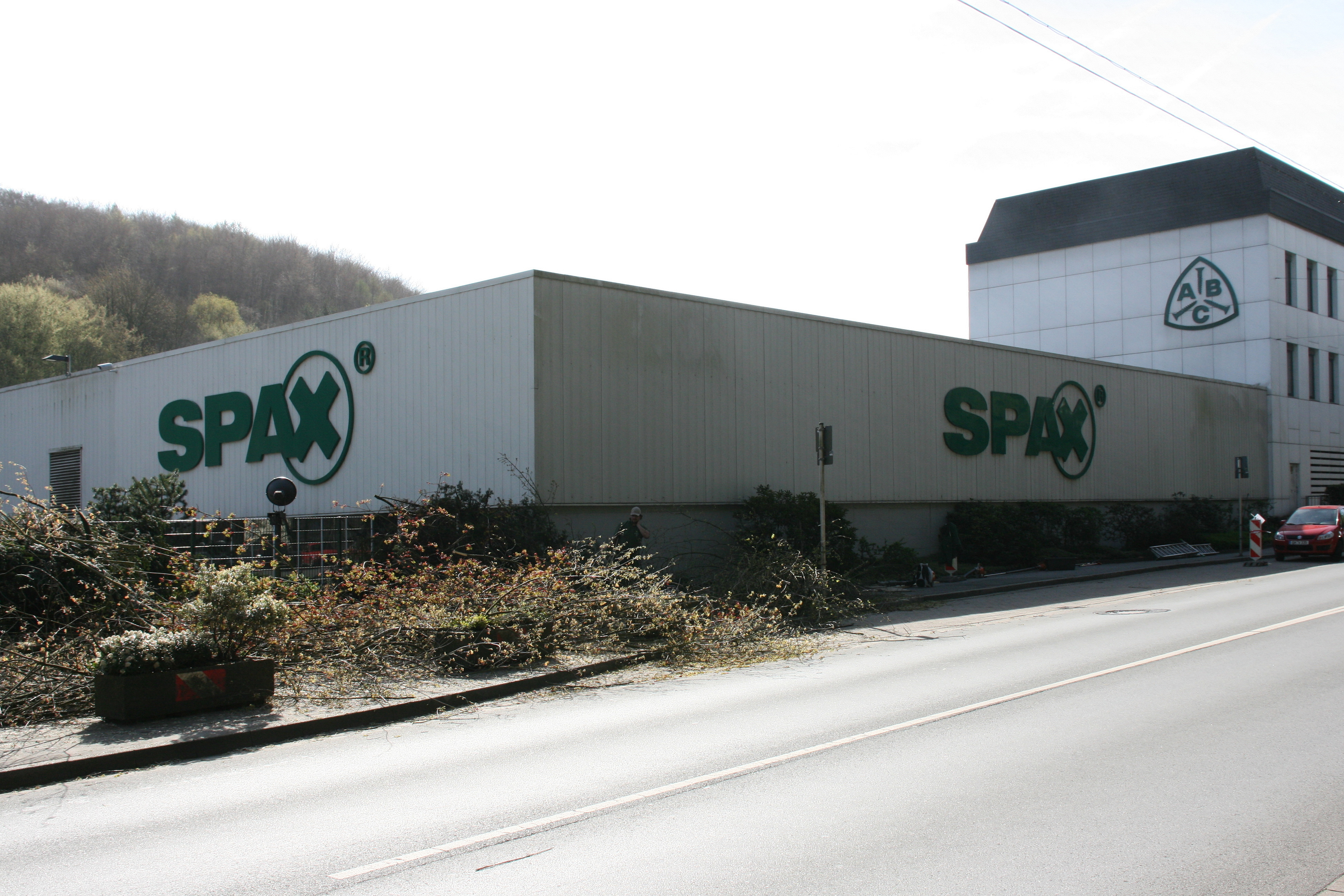
- Main plant in Ennepetal, Germany
- Type: Privately held company (GmbH & Co KG)
- Industry: Fasteners, plastics engineering
- Founded: 8 September 1823; 203 years ago
- Headquarters: Ennepetal, Germany
- Key people: Nikolas Dicke (chair), Michael Salzig, Christian Abke
- Revenue: €300 million (2021)
- Number of employees: 1,395 (2021)
- Website: www.altenloh.com

Altenloh, Brinck & Co (ABC), headquartered in the Milspe district of Ennepetal, is Germany's oldest screw factory. ABC is internationally known for its Spax screw brand. The companies of the group are manufacturers of fastening and plastics technology and produce around 50 million screws a day.

== History ==
=== Founding and 19th-century history ===
Altenloh, Brinck & Co was founded in 1823 by Theodor and Daniel Altenloh, Wilhelm Brinck, Franz Arnold Riecke and Johann Christoph Wellershaus in Milspe, Westphalia, in the Kingdom of Prussia, as one of the first German screw factories. Operations began in 1825 with three workers. From 1829, the company exported to other countries. In 1844, the workforce had grown to 100 employees, most of them children and young people between the ages of 12 and 16. In 1856, the company was one of the first in Germany to establish a company health insurance fund to provide social security for its employees, followed in 1868 by a support fund in the event of accident or death.

In 1857, a first steam engine was installed, which provided energy independent of water power. In 1866–7, the actual industrial mass production began with the first fully automatic wood screw machines. For further mechanization, self-designed automatic packing and counting machines were used from 1884. In 1897, the bent ABC triangle was registered as a trademark, after the term “A-B-C screws” had already been used as a designation since 1867.

=== 20th century ===
In 1912–3, a branch plant was established in Gevelsberg, Westphalia (Plant II); from 1915, the production of cold-formed wood and machine screws started there. Here, the non-cutting process of thread rolling was also used for the first time. In 1923, a forge was added to the plant for the production of bolts and nuts by hot working. ABC benefited from the armament policy of the Nazi regime in the 1930s and the subsequent war economy in World War II as a war-relevant company. To maintain production, forced laborers were also employed from 1940.

With the introduction of the self-tapping SPAX multi-material construction screw in 1967, the company revolutionized the market for fasteners. In 1973, the window construction screw FEX was developed for the window construction industry.

In 1978, production of screws for the automotive industry began for the first time, which later became an independent company within the group, ABC Umformtechnik. The company is a supplier for all major European car manufacturers, and in 2021 a majority stake was sold to the Chinese Fawer Automotive Parts. In 1991, ABC acquired the German household appliance and automotive supplier AZ Ausrüstung und Zubehör. It was sold to the Vollmann Group in 2017.

Since the 1980s, ABC had advanced its international market presence by establishing sales companies, first in Spain, and later in France, Poland, England, Turkey and the United States.

=== 21st century ===
In 2003, the two business units ABC Verbindungstechnik (from 2008 Spax International) and ABC Umformtechnik were transformed into two separate companies and brought under the umbrella of the Altenloh, Brinck & Co Group, which has since acted as a holding company. To strengthen the automotive sector, two companies in France – ADL Construction Mecanique in Lagny-sur-Marne and Société des Forges de Froncles SFF in Froncles – were acquired in 2005 and 2006.

In 2006, the Altenloh, Brinck & Co Group acquired Trufast Corporation of Bryan, Ohio, U.S., a manufacturer of fastening technology for the commercial roofing industry. In 2010, the separate business units Trufast and ABC US were merged to form Altenloh, Brinck & Co. US, Inc. with headquarters in Bryan, Ohio. 2017 saw the acquisition of fastener manufacturer Rodenhouse (now Trufast Walls) in Grand Rapids, Michigan.

In 2010, ABC acquired a majority stake in SABEU-Kunststoffwerke in Northeim, Germany, a specialist in injection molded components and plastic membranes for the packaging and medical industries.

== Company group ==
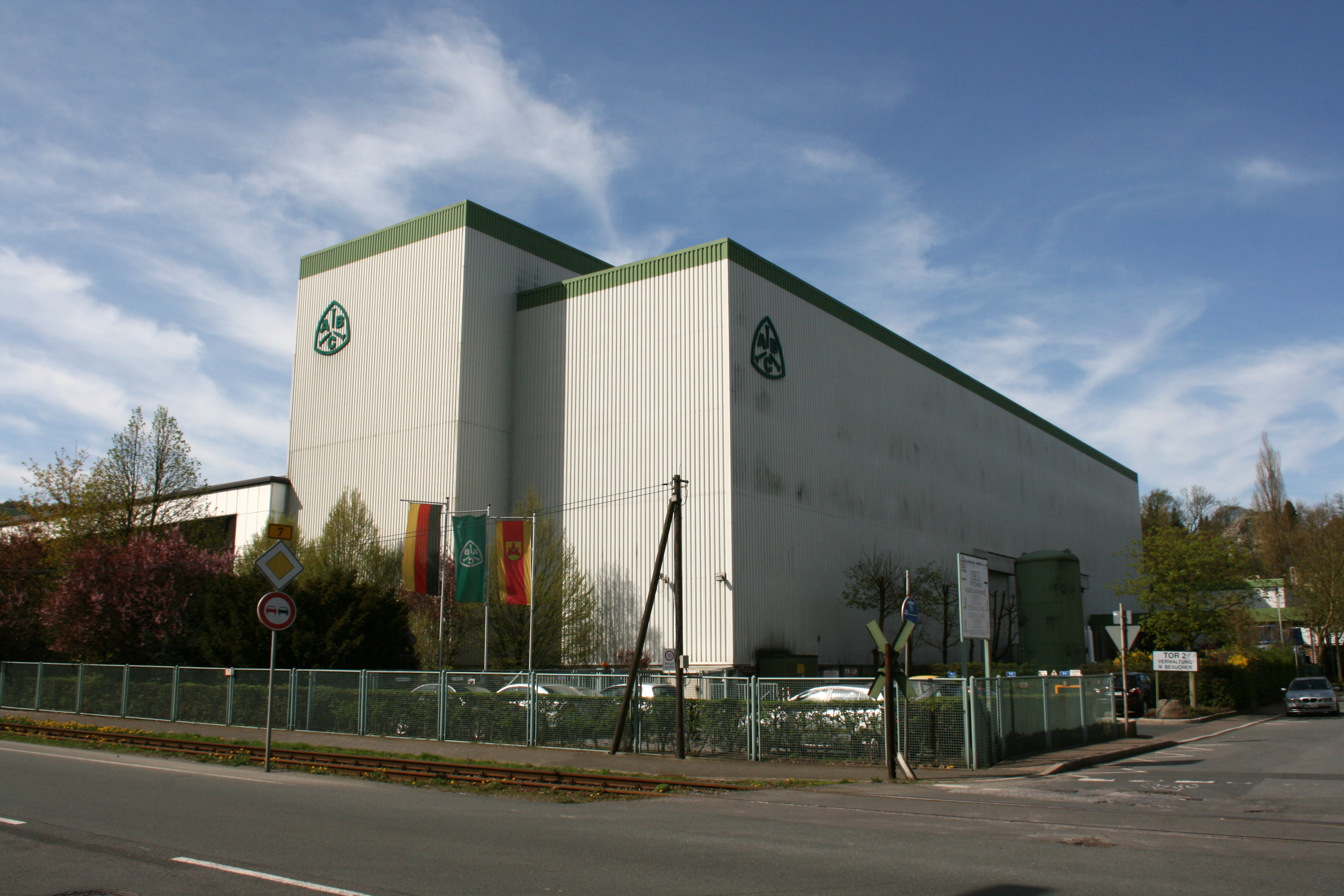
Plant II in Gevelsberg, Germany

Altenloh, Brinck & Co is still a family-run business today, with a shareholder structure that in some cases stretches back over eight generations to the five founding fathers. The group of companies consists of the sub-companies:

- SPAX International GmbH & Co. KG, Ennepetal and Gevelsberg, Germany
- ALTENLOH, BRINCK & CO. US, Inc., Bryan and Pioneer, Ohio; Grand Rapids, Michigan, U.S.
- SABEU GmbH & Co. KG, Northeim and Radeberg, Germany
- Société des Forges de Froncles S.A., Froncles, France

as well as the foreign sales companies

- Spax France in Saint-Thibault-des-Vignes
- Spax UK in Wolverhampton
- Spax Poland in Wieliczka near Krakow
- Spax Spain in Madrid
- Spax Pacific for Australia and New Zealand in Cairns North
- Spax Sweden in Kumla
