= Tested.com =

YouTube channel and website by Adam Savage

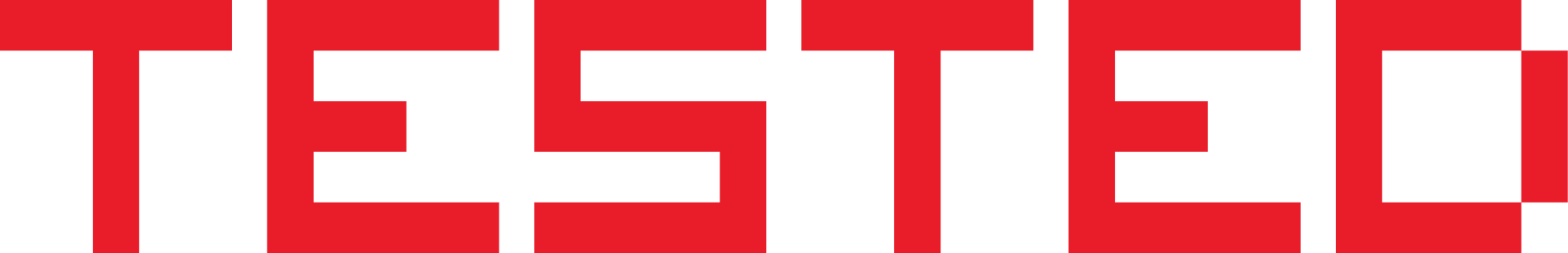

YouTube information
- Channel: Adam Savage's Tested
- Years active: 2010–present
- Genres: Maker culture; technology
- Subscribers: 7.26 million
- Views: 1.85 billion
- Last updated: August 15, 2026
- Website: tested.com

Tested.com (often simply called Tested) is a website and YouTube channel that focuses on maker culture and technology. The company was started by Will Smith and Norman Chan in 2010, with MythBusters hosts Adam Savage and Jamie Hyneman joining the company in 2012. The channel has since been rebranded to Adam Savage's Tested, with Hyneman and Smith both no longer involved.

== History ==
Making the move from Maximum PC, Will Smith and Norman Chan joined Whiskey Media in 2010 to launch Tested.com. The move allowed Smith and Chan to create content for all forms of technology, rather than being limited to personal computers.

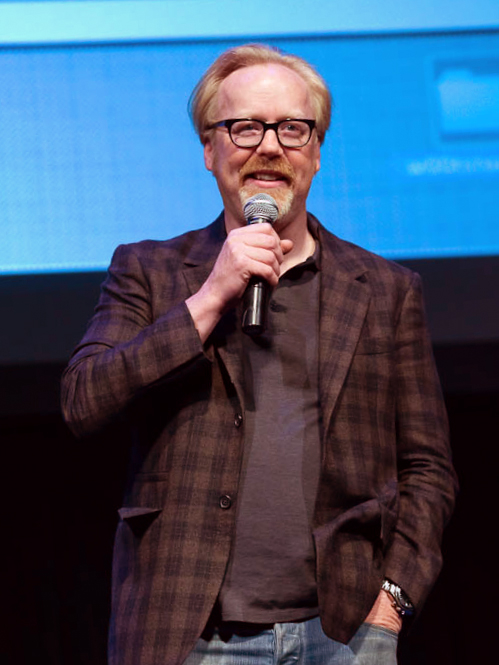
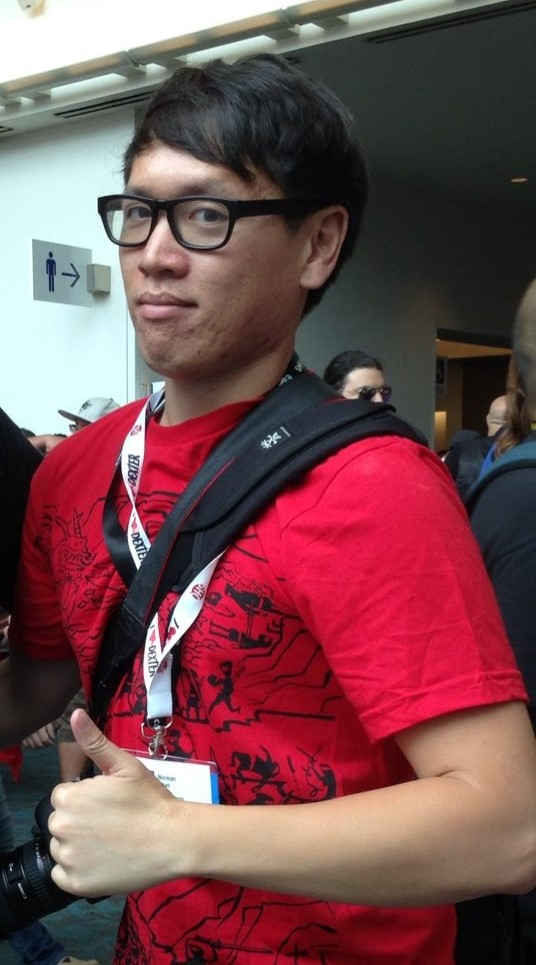
Adam Savage (left) and Norman Chan

Adam Savage and Jamie Hyneman joined the website in 2012. Hyneman left the company in early 2016. After the end of the pair's show MythBusters early that same year, Savage increased the amount of content he was producing for the YouTube channel and the site. In April 2016, Will Smith left Tested to start his own company, Foo VR.

In 2016, Savage and Chan performed live stage shows titled "Tested the Show: Journeys". Some of the shows also featured Simone Giertz and chef J. Kenji López-Alt.

In 2019, Tested launched a collaboration with virtual reality brand Oculus. The project included episodic experience in which the user was virtually placed next to a maker as they constructed a build, and featured Rick Lyon, Griffon Ramsey, and Savage, among others.

Adam Savage now serves as editor-in-chief of Tested, with the YouTube channel being renamed to "Adam Savage's Tested". Videos on the channel now focus on Savage constructing costumes and props in his workshop, as well as visiting film studios or collaborating with other makers, among other activities. Savage has visited Boston Dynamics to interact with their robots on multiple occasions, including constructing a rickshaw pulled by Spot. Several videos on the channel feature Savage donning cosplay that conceals his identity and walking across comic convention floors. Savage described Tested as a "vehicle for promoting the joy in making things. I use that term as broadly as possible, whether it’s photography or film or music or theater or costume or setting up a shop, outfitting a car."

In 2019, Savage and Tested were nominated for "Best Web Personality/Host" at the Webby Awards and was the People's Voice Winner in the category of "How-To & DIY (Video Series & Channels)". In 2020, Savage and Tested were an Honoree in the category of "Best Web Personality/Host".
