= Robertson screw =

Screw with a square socket in the head

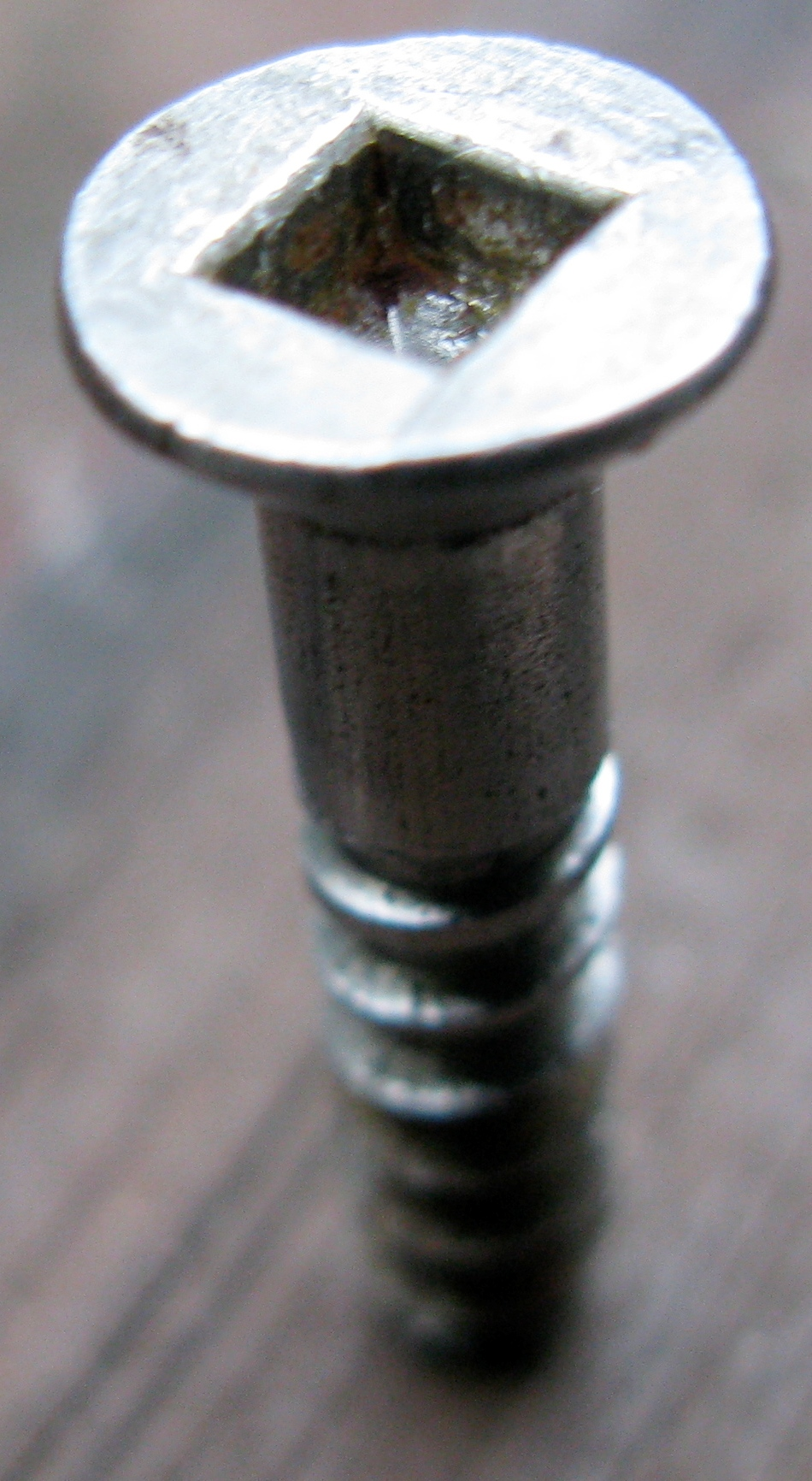

A Robertson screw, also known as a square screw or Scrulox, is a type of screw with a square-shaped socket in the screw head and a corresponding square protrusion on the tool. Both the tool and socket have a slight taper.

The contemporary square-drive screw has all but replaced the Robertson screw proper and is commonly referred to as a Robertson because it has practically identical drive dimensions and the same colour identification system. The contemporary square drive socket, like the original, has slightly tapered sides. Under ASME B18.6.3, the fit gauge used to inspect square recesses has flats tapered at 2.5 degrees.

The original purpose of the taper was to enable the screws to be made using cold forming of the heads,but the taper had two other advantages which have helped popularize it: It makes inserting the tool easier and it helps keep the screw on the tool without the user's having to hold it there.

The Robertson screw is specified as ANSI Type III Square Center.

== Usage and design ==
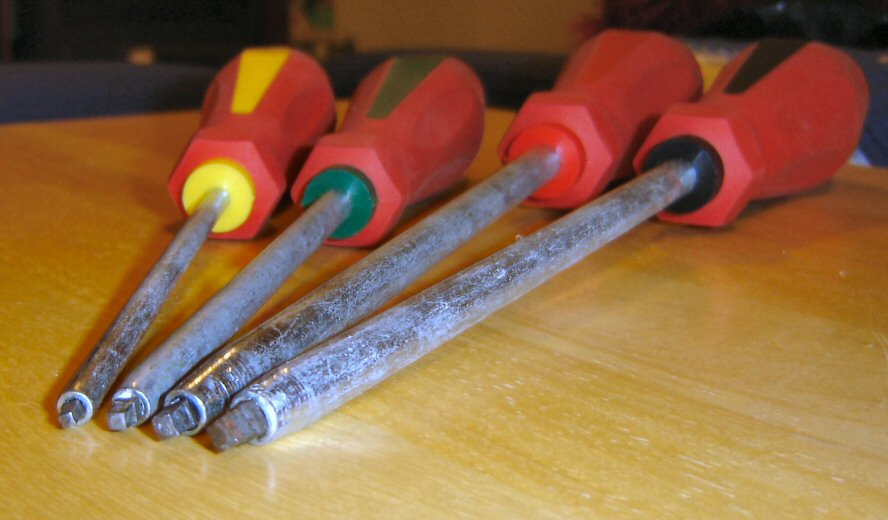
Close-up of Robertson drivers

Robertson screws are commonplace in Canada, though they have been used in other countries and are becoming much more common. As patents expire and awareness of their advantages have spread, Robertson fasteners have become popular in woodworking and general construction. Combination Robertson/Phillips/slotted fasteners are often used in the electrical trade, particularly for device and circuit breaker terminals, as well as clamp connectors.

Robertson screwdrivers are easy to use one-handed, because the tapered socket tends to retain the screw, even if it is shaken. They also allow the use of angled screwdrivers and trim-head screws. The socket-headed Robertson screws are self-centering and reduce cam out. They also stop a power tool when set, and can be more easily removed if painted over, or old and rusty. In industry, they speed up production and reduce product damage.

== History ==
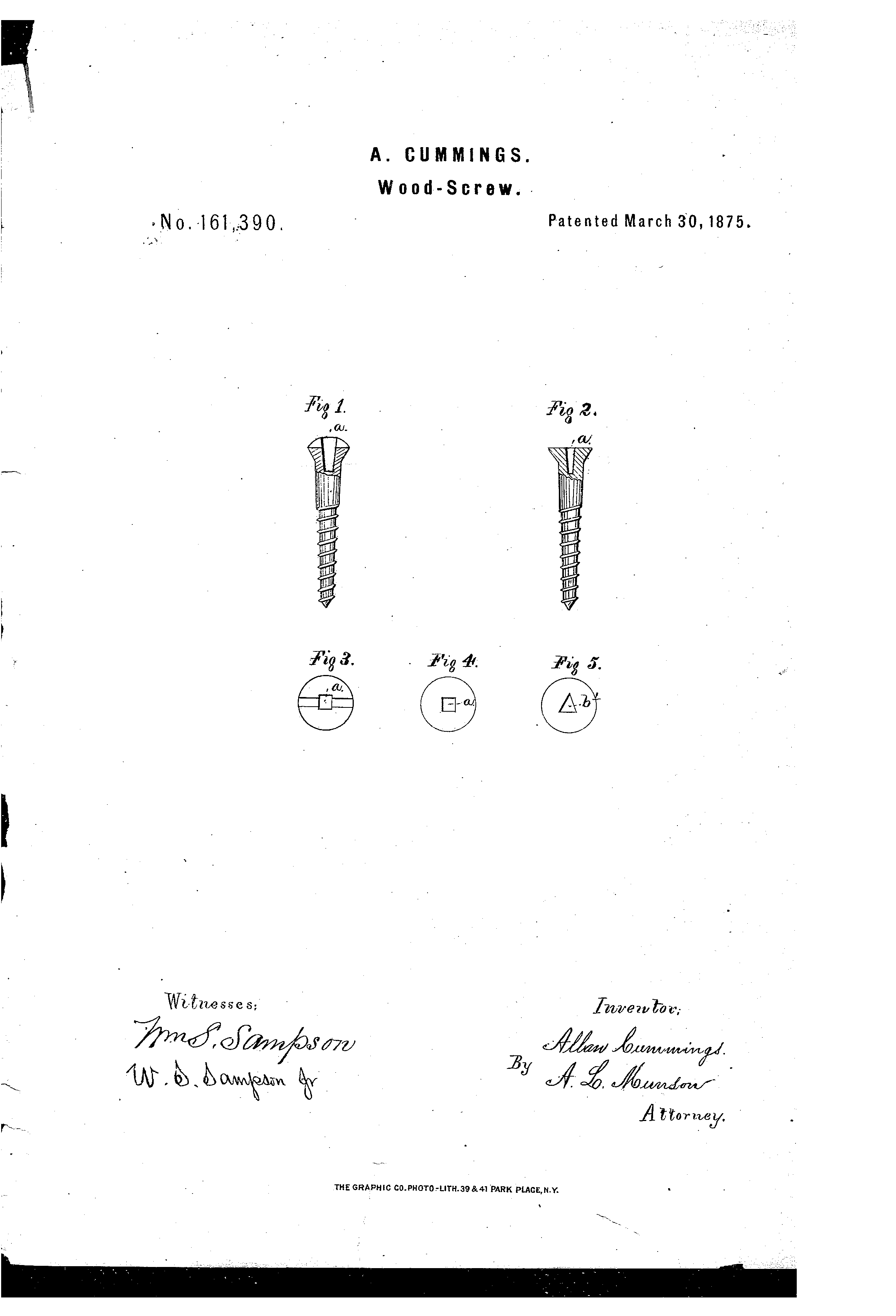
US patent 161390, Allan Cummings, 1875, wood screw drives

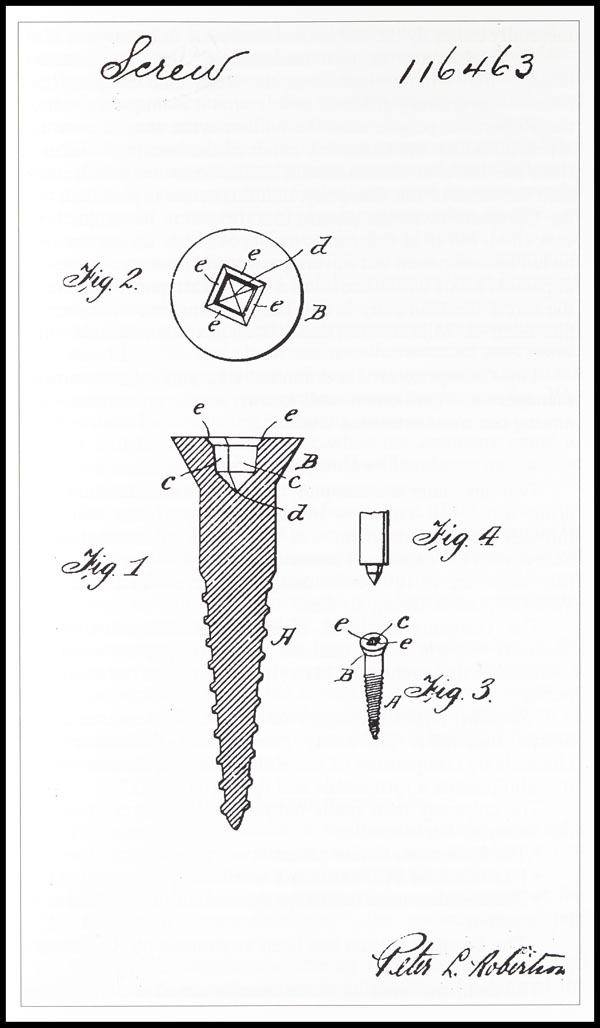
Illustration from Robertson patent application

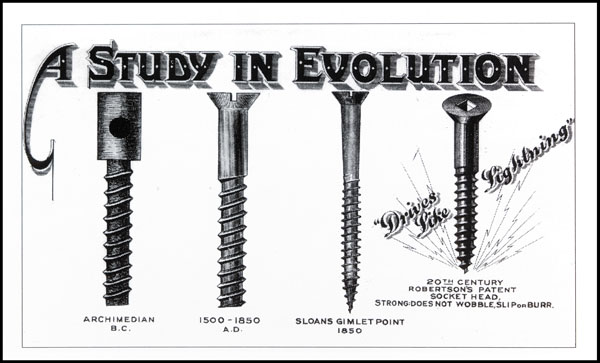
Advertisement: "A Study in Evolution"

Diagram of a Robertson screw head

=== Background ===
The internal-drive square socket for screws (as well as the corresponding triangular socket drive) had been conceived several decades before the invention of the Robertson screw and driver. An earlier patent covering both square-socket- and triangle-socket-drive wood screws, U.S. patent 161,390, was issued to Allan Cummings of New York City on 30 March 1875. As with other drive types conceived and patented in the 1860s through 1890s, it was not manufactured widely during its patent lifespan because of the difficulty and expense of doing so.

=== Invention ===
P. L. Robertson invented the Robertson screw and screwdriver in 1906 and received the Canadian patent in 1907 (CA103387, U.S. patent CA103387A) and US patent in 1911 (U.S. patent 1,003,657) for a manufacturing machine. His breakthrough in 1908 was to design the socket's taper and proportions in such a combination that the heads could be easily and successfully cold formed, making such screws a valuable commercial proposition. Today, cold forming (stamping in a die) is still their most common fabrication method, although rotary broaching is also common. Linear broaching, cutting corners into a drilled hole (similar to the action of a mortising machine for woodworking) has also been used over the decades.

=== Licensing ===
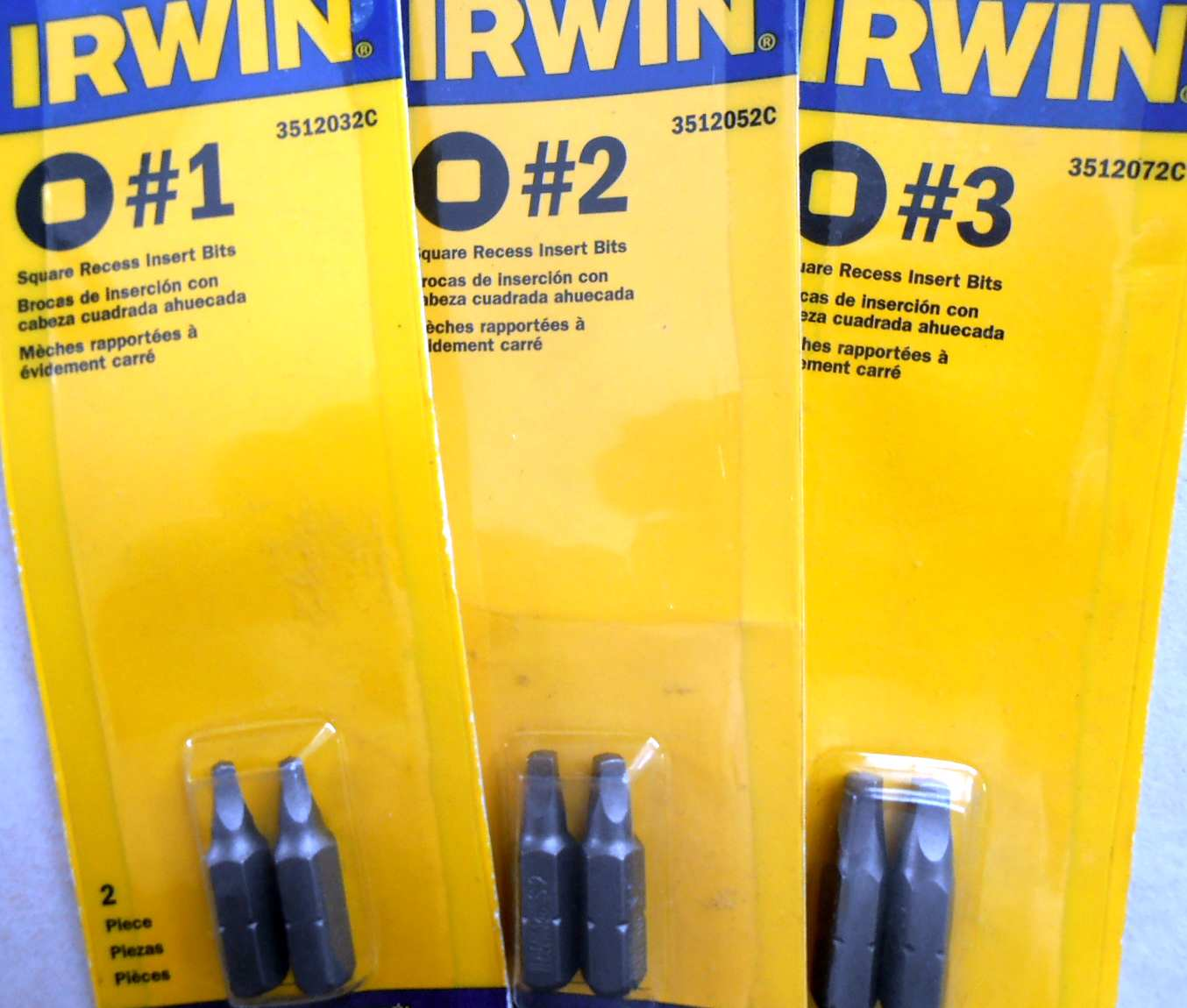
Screwdriver bits in different sizes for Robertson screws

When Henry Ford tried the Robertson screws, he found that they saved considerable time in Model T production. When Robertson refused to license the design, Ford realized that the supply of screws would not be guaranteed, and chose to limit their use to his Canadian division.

== Standard square drive sizes ==
Square recess dimensions
Color	No	Screw sizes	Fraction	Range	
Color	No	Screw sizes	Fraction	in	mm
Orange	#00	#1, #2		0.05	1.3
Yellow	#0	#3, #4	1/16 in +	0.0696–0.071	1.77–1.80
Green	#1	#5, #6, #7	3/32 in -	0.090–0.091	2.3–2.3
Red	#2	# 8, #9, #10	7/64 in +	0.111–0.1126	2.82–2.86
Black	#3	#12, 1/4	1/8 in +	0.1315–0.133	3.34–3.38
Brown	#4	5/16, 3/8	3/16 in +	0.1895–0.191	4.81–4.85

== Combination screws for electrical applications ==
Many screws used in electrical applications (for example, a typical NEMA 5-15R, breaker screws, and conduit screws) use a combination of a slotted/Phillips/Robertson screw head. A few tool manufacturers make bits to engage this screw head better than the traditional Phillips allowing for more torque before camout, for example, the ECX #1 & #2 from Milwaukee.
