= Screwdriver bit =

Detachable tool tips used for driving screws

A screwdriver bit is a detachable tip or toolhead used to drive screws, typically with a hand-operated screwdriver, drill, or impact driver. Interchangeable bits allow a single tool to work with many screw types and sizes. Screwdriver bits are among the most common accessories in hand and power tool systems and are used across construction, electronics, automotive repair, and woodworking. The concept of interchangeable bits has existed since at least the early 20th century.

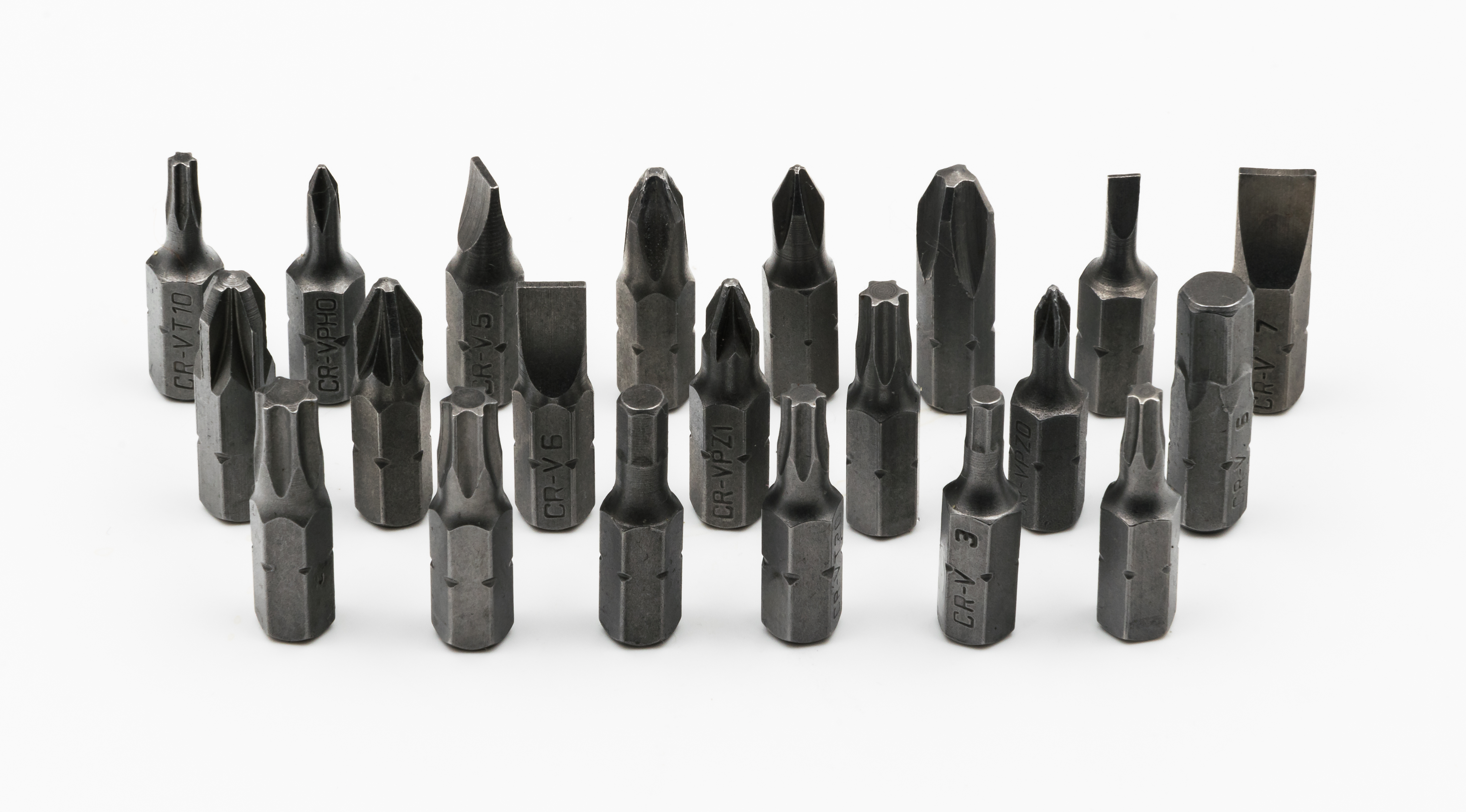
A selection of common screwdriver bits, including Phillips, Pozidriv, Torx, slotted, and hex drive types.

== Overview ==
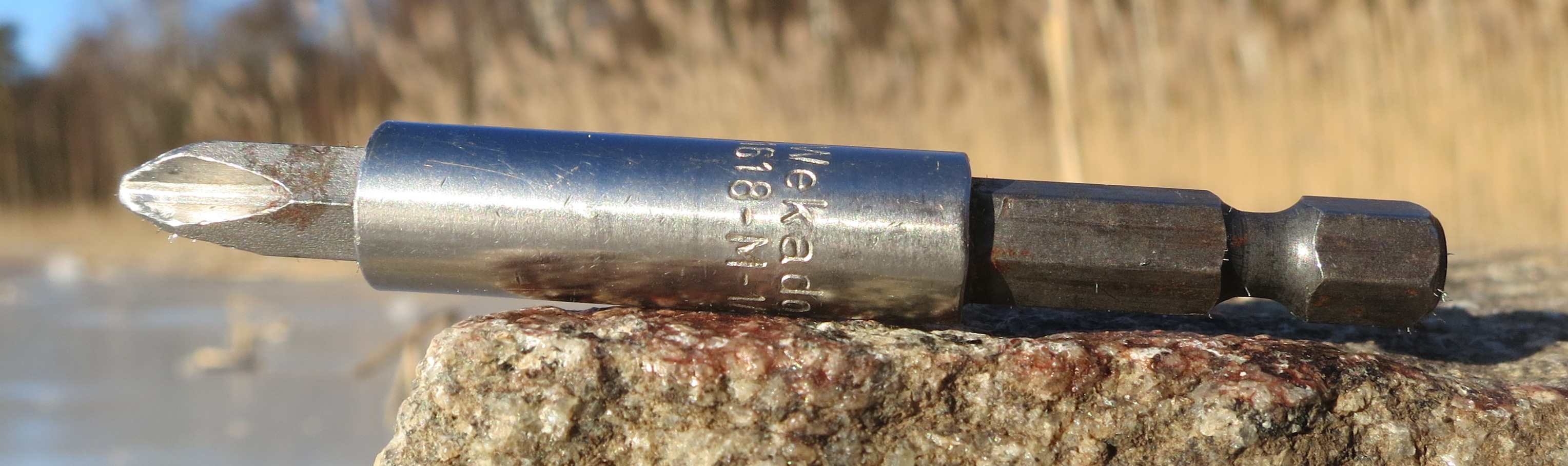
Phillips bit (left) in bit holder (center) with magnetic 1/4-inch bit shank (right).

Screwdriver bits fit into a bit holder or tool chuck and are designed to transmit torque to a screw head. Most bits are manufactured from hardened steel and follow standardized shank dimensions to ensure compatibility with a wide range of tools.

Bit sets commonly include multiple tip types (e.g., Phillips, Torx, Slotted) and sizes, making them a compact and versatile alternative to dedicated screwdrivers.

== Screw drive types ==
There are many types of screwdriver bits, each corresponding to a different screw drive geometry. Common types include:

- – Phillips (PH) – Cross-shaped tip, designed to cam out under high torque.
- – Slotted (Flathead) – A flat blade; prone to slipping and less common in power tools.
- – Pozidriv (PZ) – Similar to Phillips, with 90° contact angles and additional ribs for improved grip.
- – Torx (TX) – A six-pointed star shape, designed for high-torque applications.
- – Hex (Allen) – A hexagonal bit, common in machinery and furniture assembly.
- – Robertson (Square) – A square-shaped bit popular in woodworking and Canadian markets.
- – Security bits – Variants of the above with tamper-resistant features.

For a more complete list of screw types and matching bits, see List of screw drives.

== Bit shank standards ==
The vast majority of screwdriver bits use a ¼-inch hex shank (equivalent to 6.3 mm), standardized for compatibility across hand tools, drills, and impact drivers.

There are two primary shank forms:

Two examples of a 6.3 mm or 1/4 inch Phillips (PH2) bit
| ISO form C | ISO form E |
|---|---|
| Form C 6.3 | Form E 6.3 |
| Used in magnetic or friction-fit holders, typically in manual drivers. Small groove for spring retention. | Commonly used in power tools with locking chucks. A deep groove to engage for example ball-detent or ring-based retention systems in powered tool holders. |

=== Common shank sizes ===
| Nominal size | Marketing term | ISO form | Typical use | Width (mm) | Shank Length min. (mm) |
|---|---|---|---|---|---|
| 4 mm | "Mini Hex" "Micro Hex" 5/32" | C 4 | Precision tools, electronics | 4.0 | 9 |
| 1/4 inch | 1/4" hex | C 6.3 / E 6.3 | Standard screwdriver bits | 6.3 | 11(C) / 25(E) |
| 5/16 inch | 5/16" hex | C 8 / E 8 | Nutsetters, heavy-duty drivers | 7.9 | 13.5(C) / 27(E) |
| 7/16 inch | 7/16" hex | E 11.2 | Industrial tools | 11.1 | 31.5 |

ISO 1173 and ASME B107.4 define compatible hexagonal shank dimensions for screwdriver bits, including the widely used ¼″ (6.3 mm) interface in form E.

== History ==
The concept of interchangeable screwdriver bits dates to the late 19th century, with an 1889 U.S. patent for a spiral driver featuring a removable tip. By the early 20th century, bits were already in common use with braces for faster screwdriving. By the late 1920s, companies like Husky Wrench Co. were marketing complete product lines of forged bits and modular handles for heavy-duty applications.

The rise of powered assembly tools in the mid-20th century greatly increased the demand for standardized bit interfaces. Early bit holders were typically proprietary, but manufacturers and industrial users began to push for common specifications. In 1975, the International Organization for Standardization (ISO) published the first edition of ISO 1173, establishing dimensions and drive-end forms for machine-operated screwdriver bits. The following year, the German Institute for Standardization introduced DIN 3126, a closely related national standard that defined hex shank forms such as C and E. DIN 3126 remained widely used until it was officially superseded in 2009 by DIN ISO 1173, harmonizing it with the ISO specification. In the United States, the American Society of Mechanical Engineers published a parallel specification as ASME B107.4, which defines driving and spindle ends for portable powered tools.

Today, the ¼″ hexagonal shank (6.3 mm) defined in both standards has become the universal interface for general-purpose screwdriver bits, supported by a global ecosystem of tools, holders, and accessories.

== Impact driver bits ==
The widespread use of impact drivers since the late 20th century introduced new performance demands on screwdriver bits. Unlike drills, which apply continuous rotational force, impact drivers deliver intermittent bursts of high torque. This subjects bits—especially at the tip and shank—to repeated shock loading.

In response, manufacturers developed impact-rated bits designed specifically to withstand these stresses. According to Wiha Tools, Bosch, and Milwaukee Tool, common features include:

- Torsion zones that flex to absorb torque spikes.
- Tougher steel alloys, such as S2 tool steel.
- Ductile heat treatment to reduce brittleness.

Standard bits typically share the same ¼″ hex shank (e.g., ISO Form E 6.3) but often fail prematurely in impact drivers. Their harder heat treatment improves wear resistance but makes them more brittle, leading to chipping and fatigue cracks under repeated torque.

According to a 2020 review, standard bits may suffice in low- to moderate-torque tasks, but impact-rated bits offer greater durability when driving large fasteners, working in dense materials, or under sustained commercial use.

Impact-rated bits remain backward-compatible with drills and manual screwdrivers, though their enhanced design provides no significant advantage in those contexts.

== Standard dimensions ==
ISO 1173:2001 defines the standardized dimensions as follows.

=== Form C ===

Diagram: Dimensions for Form C 6.3, 8 and 12.5

Diagram: Dimensions for Form C 4

ISO 1173:2001 Form C Dimensions, dimensions in millimeters

| Nominal dimension | S | | D | E | | A | B | R |
| Nominal dimension | max | min | h12 | max | min | min | | min |
|---|---|---|---|---|---|---|---|---|
| 4 | 3.96 | 3.91 | – | 4.48 | 4.42 | 9 | 4 | – |
| 6.3 | 6.35 | 6.29 | 6.7 | 7.18 | 7.11 | 11 | 8.2 | 0.3 |
| 8 | 7.93 | 7.87 | 8.2 | 8.96 | 8.90 | 13.5 | 10.2 | 0.3 |
| 12.5 | 12.70 | 12.63 | 13.5 | 14.35 | 14.27 | 15.9 | 12.7 | 0.3 |

=== Form E ===

Diagram: Dimensions for Form E

ISO 1173:2001 Form E Dimensions, dimensions in millimeters

| Nominal dimension | S | | D | E | | A | B | C | R |
| Nominal dimension | max | min | h12 | max | min | min | | ~ | min |
|---|---|---|---|---|---|---|---|---|---|
| 6.3 | 6.35 | 6.29 | 4.7 | 7.18 | 7.11 | 25 | 9.5 | 1 | 2.4 |
| 8 | 7.93 | 7.87 | 6.3 | 8.96 | 8.90 | 27 | 5.4 | 1.2 | 2.4 |
| 11.2 | 11.11 | 11.04 | 8.7 | 12.56 | 12.48 | 31.5 | 6.7 | 1.2 | 2.8 |

Note, ASME B107.4 defines two further sizes that are not covered by ISO1173:2001. These are 15.88 mm (5/8 inch nominal) and 19.05 mm (3/4 inch nominal).

ASME B107.4 additional hex shank sizes, dimensions in millimeters

| Nominal dimension | S | | D | E | | A | B | C | R |
| Nominal dimension | max | min | h12 | max | min | min | | ~ | min |
|---|---|---|---|---|---|---|---|---|---|
| 15.88 | 15.87 | 15.80 | 13.49 | – | | 44.45 | 8.735 | 1.59 | 3.97 |
| 19.05 | 19.05 | 18.97 | 16.67 | – | | 50.80 | 8.735 | 1.59 | 3.97 |

== See also ==
- Drill bit
- Impact driver
- List of screw drives
- Screwdriver
