= Impact driver =

Hand tool for loosening threaded fasteners, with a powerful intermittent action

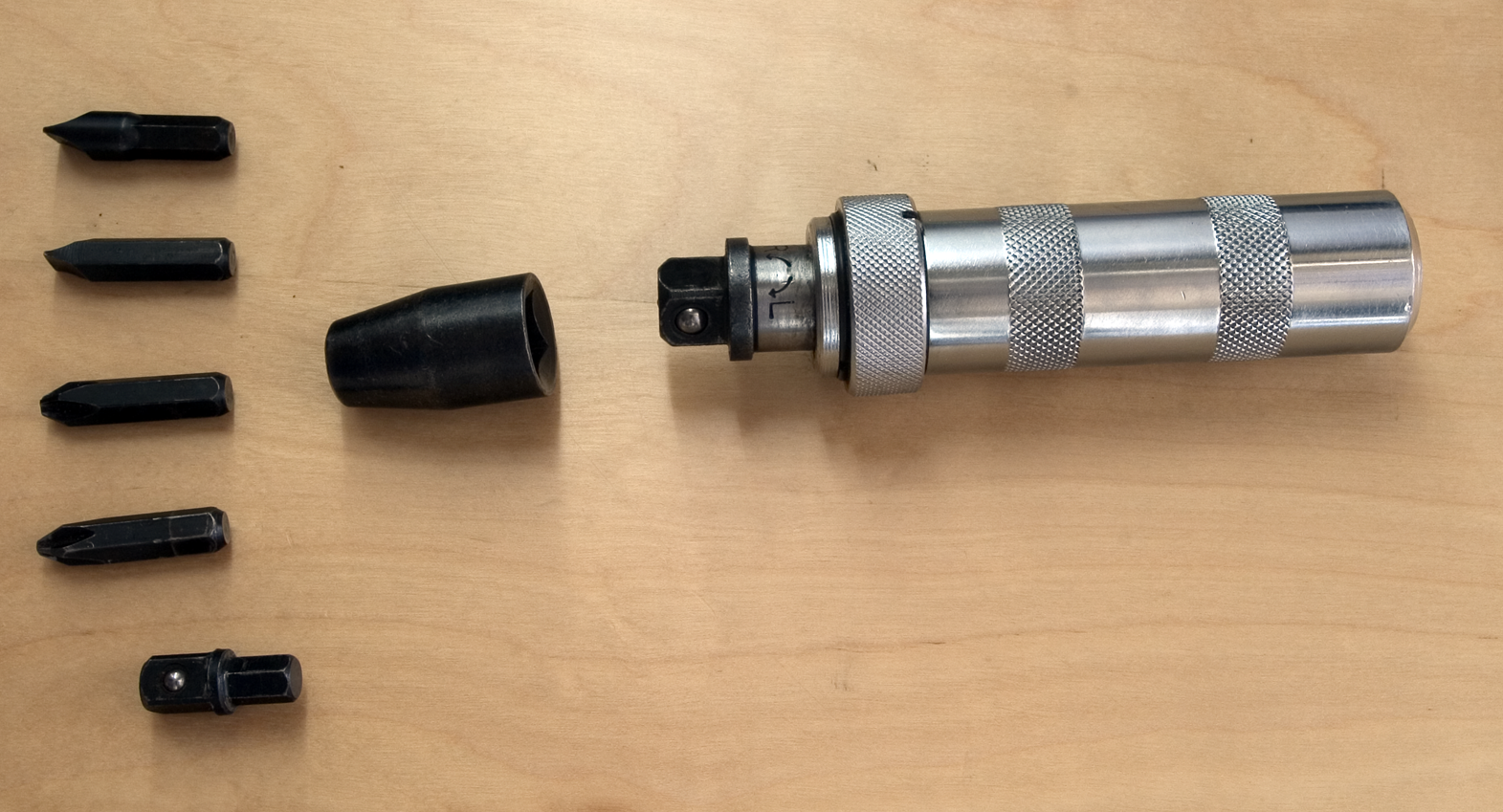
A manual impact driver (for use with a hammer) with screwdriver bits and adapters.

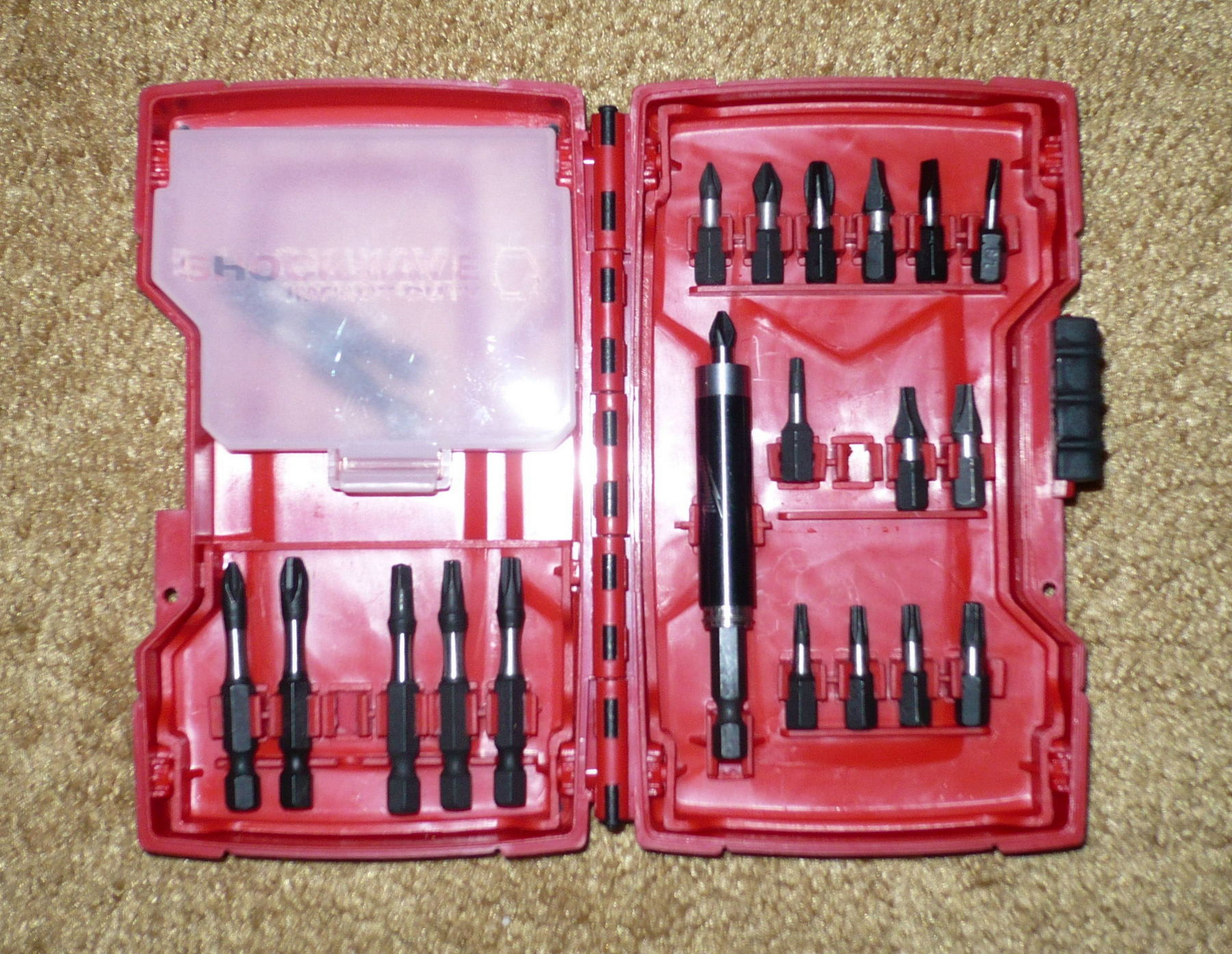
Impact driver guide set with bits.

An impact driver is a tool that delivers a strong, sudden rotational force and forward thrust. The force can be delivered either by a blow struck with a hammer in the case of manual impact drivers, or mechanically in the case of powered impact drivers.

It is often used by mechanics to loosen larger screws, bolts and nuts that are corrosively "frozen" or over-torqued. The direction can also be reversed for situations where screws have to be tightened with torque more than a screwdriver can reasonably provide.

== Manual ==
Manual impact drivers consist of a heavy outer sleeve that surrounds an inner core that is splined to it. The spline is curved so that when the user strikes the outer sleeve with a hammer, its downward force works on the spline to produce turning force on the core and any socket or work bit attached to it. The tool translates the large angular momentum of the heavy sleeve to the lighter core to generate large amounts of torque. At the same time, the striking blow from the hammer forces the impact driver forward into the screw reducing or eliminating cam out. This attribute is beneficial for Phillips screws which are prone to cam out. It is also excellent for use with the Robertson square socket head screws that are in common use in Canada.

== Powered ==
Typical battery-powered impact drivers are similar to electric drills when used to drive screws or bolts, but additionally have a spring-driven mechanism that applies rotational striking blows once the torque required becomes too great for the motor alone. This should not be confused with the hammer mechanism found on hammer drills, which is a longitudinal blow. Most impact drivers have a handle to make it easier to hold onto. An impact driver is more appropriate than a drill for tightening bolts.

An electric impact driver typically delivers less torque and accepts smaller tool bits than an impact wrench. This makes the impact driver more suitable for driving smaller screws in (for example) construction work, while an impact wrench is preferred in situations requiring more torque to drive larger bolts and nuts (such as lug nuts).
