= Square drive =

A square drive may refer to:

- Square drive (socket), a male/female square connection fitting for a wrench socket
- External square drive, a square-shaped head of a fastener
- Internal square drive, also known as a Robertson drive, a square-shaped indentation in the head of a fastener
- a batting shot in cricket
