= Henry F. Phillips =

American businessman

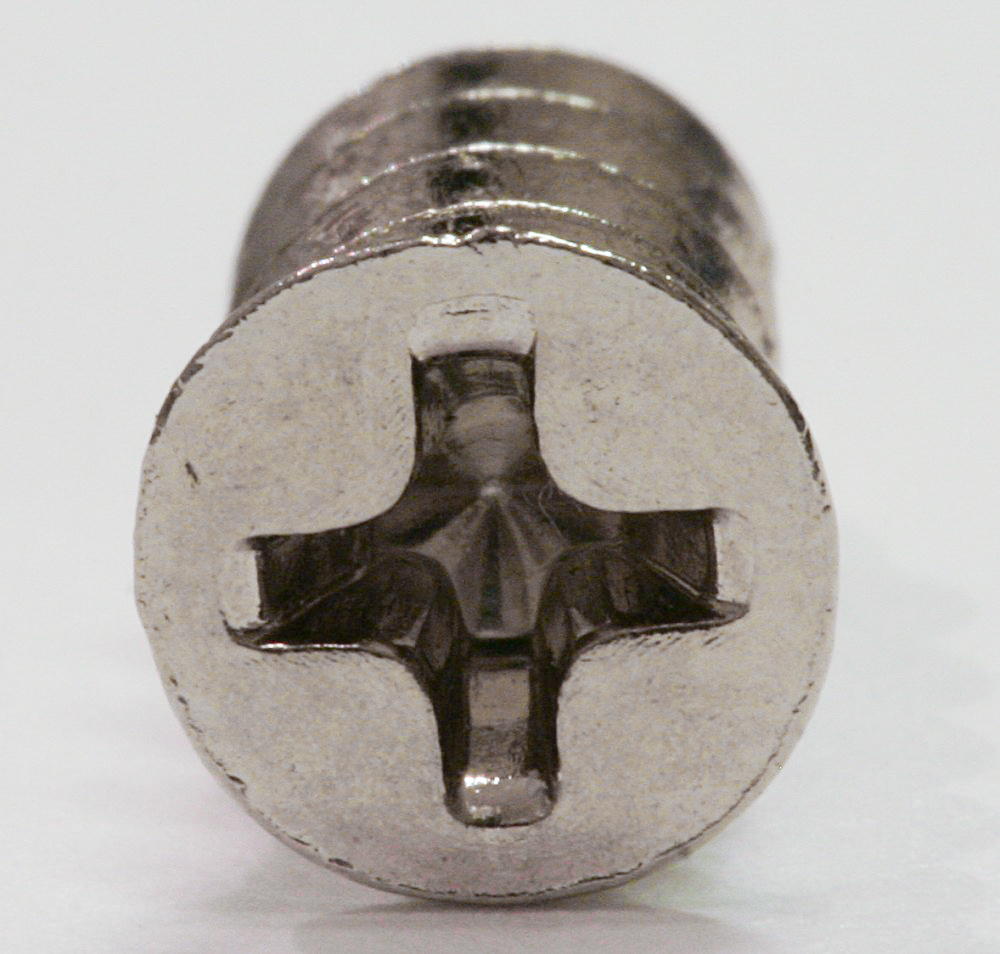
Phillips screw head

Henry Frank Phillips (June 4, 1889 – April 13, 1958) was an American businessman from Portland, Oregon. The Phillips-head ("crosshead") screw and screwdriver are named after him.

The importance of the crosshead screw design lies in its self-centering property, useful on automated production lines that use powered screwdrivers. Phillips' major contribution was in driving the crosshead concept forward to the point where it was adopted by screwmakers and automobile companies. The credited inventor of the Phillips screw was John P. Thompson who, in 1932, patented (#1,908,080) a recessed cruciform screw and in 1933, a screwdriver for it.

== Biography ==
After failing to interest manufacturers, Thompson sold his self-centering design to Phillips in 1935. Phillips formed the Phillips Screw Company in 1934. After refining the design (U.S. Patent #2,046,343, U.S. Patents #2,046,837 to 2,046,840) for the American Screw Company of Providence, Rhode Island, Phillips succeeded in bringing the design to industrial manufacturing and promoting its rapid adoption as a machine screw standard. American Screw then spent $500,000 originating a method of manufacture. One of the first customers was General Motors, who used the design in 1936 for its Cadillac assembly-lines. By 1940, 85% of U.S. screw manufacturers had a license for the design.

Due to failing health, Phillips retired in 1945. He lost his patent in 1949. He died on 13 Apr 1958 at age 68 in Portland, Oregon.
