= Cam out =

Screwdriver slippage

Cam out (also cam-out or camming out) is a process by which a screwdriver slips out of the head of a screw being driven once the torque required to turn the screw exceeds a certain amount. Repeatedly camming out damages the screw, and possibly also the screwdriver, and should normally be avoided.

== Phillips screwdriver ==
The Phillips screwdriver design has a tendency to cam out during operation due to angled contact surfaces, which create an axial force that pushes the driver out of the recess as torque is applied. Despite popular belief, there is no clear evidence that this was a deliberate design feature. When the original patent application was filed in 1933, the inventors described the key objectives as providing a screw head recess that (a) could be produced by a simple punching operation and which (b) was adapted for firm engagement with a driving tool with "no tendency of the driver to cam out".

Nevertheless, the tendency of the Phillips screw to cam out easily was later found to be advantageous when used with early power tools, which had relatively unreliable torque-limiting clutches. In this context, cam-out helped protect the screw, threads, and driving bit from damage caused by excessive torque. A follow-up patent in 1942 further refining the Phillips screw design describes this feature and argues that if screw-driving clutches were perfect, a screw recess with zero vertical contact angles (and thus no axial cam-out force) could be utilized. However, it noted that such designs had proven unsatisfactory on assembly lines, as the driving bits would not disengage in time to prevent damage.

Several later designs derived from the Phillips, such as Pozidriv and Supadriv, were designed to reduce or eliminate cam-out. In recent years, power tools have achieved more precise torque control, and precision-engineered products are typically assembled with Torx or Pozidriv head screws, which are specifically designed to resist cam-out.

== Robertson head screws ==
Robertson screws are commonplace in Canada, and significantly reduce cam-out when compared to Phillips screws.

== See also ==
- Torx
