= List of screw drives =

At a minimum, a screw drive is a set of shaped cavities and protrusions on the screw head that allows torque to be applied to it. Usually, it also involves a mating tool, such as a screwdriver, that is used to turn it. Some of the less-common drives are classified as being "tamper-resistant".

Most heads come in a range of sizes, typically distinguished by a number, such as "Phillips #00".

== Overview ==
Category	Types
Slotted	Slotted Coin slot Hi-Torque
Cruciform drives	Cross Phillips Pozidriv Supadriv Phillips II Frearson / Reed & Prince French recess Torq-set Mortorq
Square	Robertson
Multiple-square	LOX-Recess Double-square Triple-square (XZN)
Internal hex	Hex socket Double hex
Pentalobular	Pentalobe ASTER recess
Hexalobular	Torx Torx Plus Torx Paralobe Torx ttap
Combination	Slotted/Phillips Phillips/square Slotted/Torx Clutch
External	Hex Square Slotted Hex Pentagon External Torx 12-point
Tamper-resistant	Security Torx Torx Plus Tamper-Resistant Bristol Line male Line female Line female anti-tamper One-way Oval Polydrive (RIBE) Security hex Spanner 12-spline flange Tri-angle Tri-point Tri-point-3 Tri-groove Tri-wing

== Slotted drives ==
Slot drive tool and screw sizes
Blade width		Screw size
in	mm	Screw size
3/32	2.4	0–1
1/8	3.2	2
5/32	4.0	3
3/16	4.8	4–5
1/4	6.4	6–7
5/16	7.9	8–10
3/8	9.5	12–14
7/16	11	16–18
1/2	13	18–24

Standard slot screwdriver sizes (ISO 2380).
Thickness (mm)	Width (mm)	Torque (N·m)
0.4	2.0	0.3
0.4	2.5	0.4
0.5	3.0	0.7
0.6	3.0	1.1
0.6	3.5	1.3
0.8	4.0	2.6
1.0	4.5	4.5
1.0	5.5	5.5
1.2	6.5	9.5
1.2	8.0	11.5
1.6	8.0	20.5
1.6	10.0	25.6
2.0	12.0	48.0
2.5	14.0	87.5

=== Slot ===
Slot screw drives have a single horizontal indentation (the slot) in the fastener head and is driven by a "common blade" or flat-bladed screwdriver. This form was the first type of screw drive to be developed, and, for centuries, it was the simplest and cheapest to make because it can just be sawed or filed. Blunt or damaged tools can easily be re-ground as required in any workshop. It is unique because the slot head is straightforward to manufacture, and because it can be driven by a simple handtool. The slotted screw is commonly found in existing products and installations, along with use in simple carpentry work and in applications where minimal torque is needed. Slot screws are also used in the restoration of antique furniture, vehicles, and equipment.

However, this design is not well-suited for installation by power tools, given that a power driver often cams out of the slot; this often causes damage to the screw and surrounding material. For this reason, cruciform-slotted along with drives have replaced the slot drive in numerous applications. The tool used to drive a slot is called a common blade, flat-blade, slot-head, flat-tip or flat-head / flathead screwdriver. A hollow-ground screwdriver is less likely to cam out (leave the slot due to the torque being translated into an axial force, similar to that encountered with Phillips drive but dependent only on driver blade), so more torque can be applied without damaging the screw head. Flat-blade jeweler's screwdrivers and the tips found in 1/4-inch or 6.4-millimeter drive sets are generally hollow-ground. Note that it is this typical chisel shape which allows 9 screwdriver sizes to drive 24 different slotted screw sizes, with the drawbacks of not fitting as closely as a hollow-ground screwdriver would, and increasing the possibility of damaging the fastener or surrounding area.

ISO 2380-1 specifies the internationally standardized shape and dimensions of the tips of screwdrivers for slotted-head screws as well as the minimum test torque the blade-to-handle connection shall withstand. Screwdriver tips are generally designated by blade thickness × width in mm, e.g. 1.2 × 6.5 which roughly matches a classic North American 1/4-inch screwdriver although the North American one is often a bit thinner (≈1.0 mm).

At least one mechanical method of temporarily holding a slotted screw to a matching screwdriver is available, the Quick-Wedge screw-holding screwdriver, first manufactured by the Kedman Company in the 1950s.

Dzus fasteners, which have a cam-lock body instead of a threaded body, use a slot drive.

=== Coin-slot ===
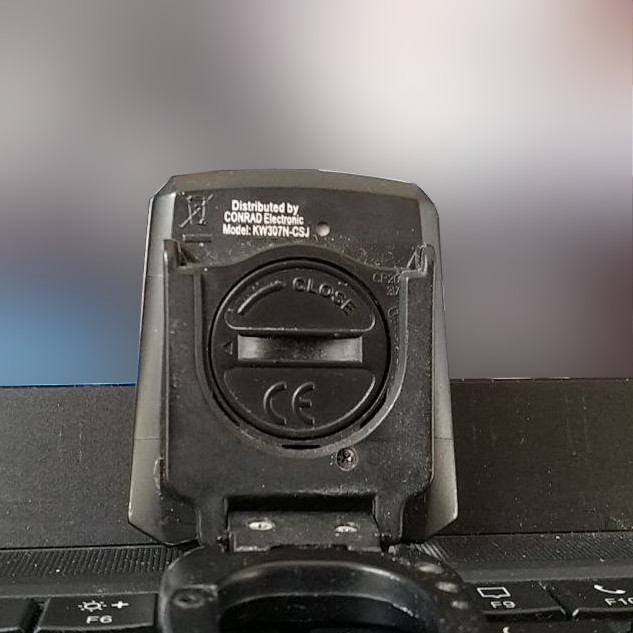
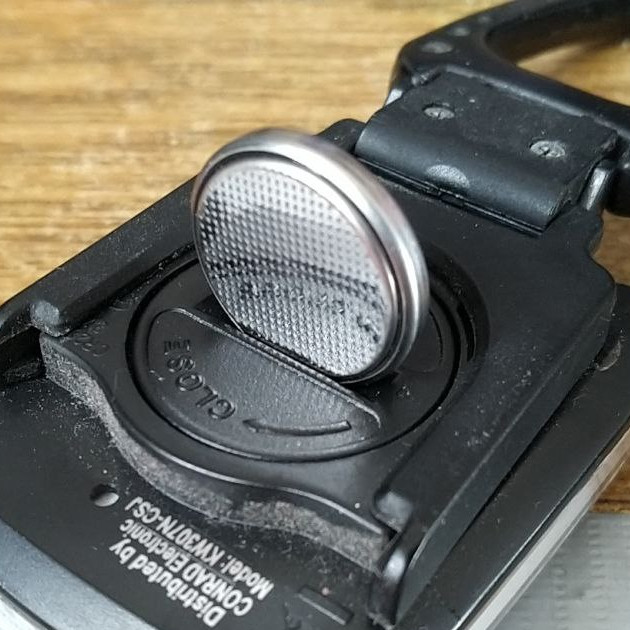
Coin slot-style screw head on a CR2032 battery housing openable using the battery itself.

Coin-slot drives are so-called because of the curved bottom of the recess, which facilitates driving them with a suitable coin. They are often used on items where the user is not likely to have a screwdriver when needed, such as recessed screws that attach cameras to tripod adapters, and battery compartments in some equipment such as children's toys.

=== Hi-Torque ===
Hi-Torque slot drives were designed by Alcoa Fastening Systems, for situations where very high torque is needed, along with the ability to repeatedly install and remove the fastener. The design features curved walls, unlike the straight-walled slot drive.

The Type II (Conical/Connie) design adds a conical cup that receives a centering pin on the driver, improving the alignment of the driving tool to the fastener recess.

== Cruciform drives ==
The following are screw drives based on a cruciform (cross) shape. Other names used for these types of drives are cross recessed, cross-head, cross tip, and cross-point; sometimes "plus" (+) as against a simple slot's "minus" (−). A double slotted screw drive is not considered cruciform because the shape is not recessed, and consists only of two orthogonal simple milled slots. Some of these types are specified in ISO 4757, Cross recesses for screws.

Cruciform Phillips and Pozidriv/Supadriv screws and screwdrivers look similar, and are often confused with each other; a Phillips screwdriver will often work with Pozidriv/Supadriv screws, but risks damaging the head of tight screws, while a Pozidriv/Supadriv screwdriver will damage a Phillips screw.

=== Cross ===
A cross or double-slot screw drive, not a true cruciform drive in that the entire cross is not engaged, has two slots, perpendicular to each other, in the fastener head; a slotted screwdriver is used to drive either of the slots. This type is usually found in cheaply-made roofing bolts and the like, where a thread of 5 mm (0.20 in) or above has a large flattened pan head. They provide some measure of redundancy: should one slot become deformed, the second may still be used.

=== Phillips ===
Phillips drive tool and fastener sizes
Driver size	Wood screw size	Machine screw size
#0	#0–1	M1.6, M2 (DIN: just M1.6) or #0, #1
#1	#2–4	M2.5, M3 (DIN: also M2) or #2, #3, #4
#2	#5–9	M3.5, M4, M5 or #5–10
#3	#10–16	M6 or #12, 1/4 in., plus 5/16 in. if round-head
#4	#18–24	M8, M10 or 3/8 in., 9/16 in., plus 5/16 in. if flat-head
#5		5/8 in., 3/4 in.

The Phillips screw drive (specified as an ANSI Type I Cross Recess and type H in ISO documentation) was created by John P. Thompson, who, after failing to interest manufacturers, sold his design to businessman Henry F. Phillips. Phillips is credited with forming a company (Phillips Screw Company), improving the design, and promoting the adoption of his product. The original 1932 patent expired in 1966, but the Phillips Screw Company continued to develop improved designs.

The American Screw Company of Providence, Rhode Island, was responsible for devising a means of efficiently manufacturing the screw, and successfully patented and licensed their method; other screw makers of the 1930s dismissed the Phillips concept because it called for a relatively complex recessed socket shape in the head of the screw, as distinct from the simple milled slot of a slotted screw. The Phillips screw design was developed as a direct solution to several problems with slotted screws: high cam-out potential; need for precise alignment to avoid slippage and damage to driver, fastener, and adjacent surfaces; and difficulty of driving with powered tools.

Phillips drive bits are often designated by the letters "PH", plus a size code 0000, 000, 00, 0, 1, 2, 3, or 4 (in order of increasing size); the numerical bit size codes do not necessarily correspond to nominal screw size numbers.

The design is often criticized for its tendency to cam out at lower torque levels than other "cross head" designs. There has long been a popular belief that this was a deliberate feature of the design, to assemble aluminium aircraft without overtightening the fasteners. There is no good evidence for this suggestion, and the property is not mentioned in the original patents.

=== Pozidriv ===
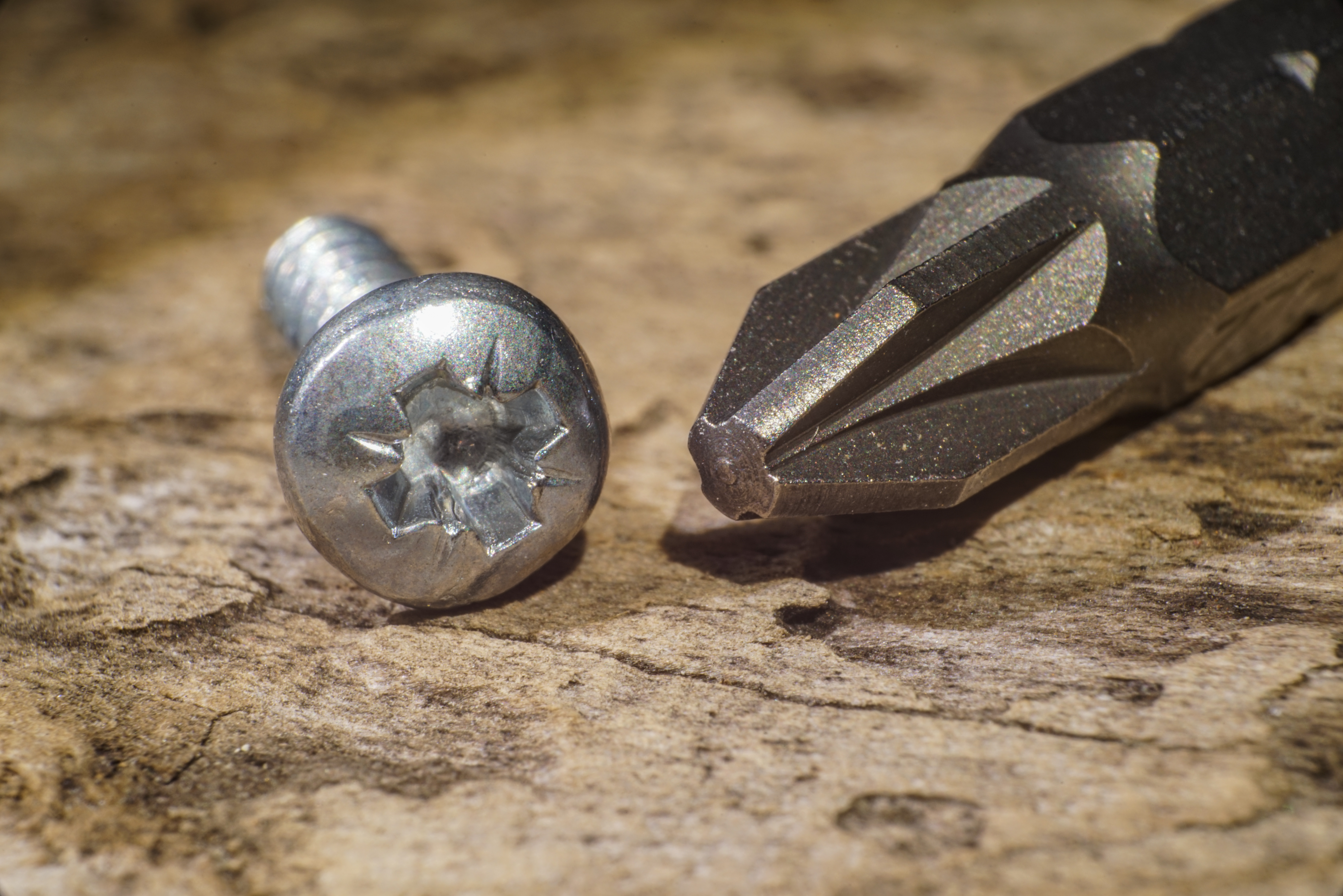
Pozidriv screw and driver bit

The Pozidriv, sometimes incorrectly spelled "Pozidrive", is an improved version of the Phillips screw drive. It is designated "Type IA" by ANSI standards, and "Type Z" in ISO documents. The Pozidriv was patented by GKN Screws and Fasteners in 1962. It was designed to allow more torque to be applied and greater engagement than Phillips drives. As a result, the Pozidriv is less likely to cam out. It is similar to, and compatible with, the Supadriv screw drive.

Pozidriv screwdrivers are often designated using the letters "PZ" followed by a size code of 0, 1, 2, 3, 4 or 5 (in order of increasing size). The numbers do not correspond to nominal screw size numbers. PZ1 is normally used in screws with nominal diameters of 2–3 mm, PZ2 in 3.5–5 mm screws and PZ3 in 5.5–8 mm. These sizes roughly correspond to the Phillips head numbers.

Pozidriv screws have a set of radial indentations (tick marks) set at 45° from the main cross recess on the head of the screw, which makes them visually distinct from Phillips screws.

While a Phillips screwdriver has slightly tapered flanks, a pointed tip, and rounded corners, a Pozidriv screwdriver has parallel flanks, a blunt tip, and additional smaller ribs at 45° to the main slots. Both Phillips and Pozidriv bit types can be manufactured in four cuts from a tapered blank, although Pozidriv screwdriver bits require a slightly more complex cutter than for Phillips bits.

Pozidriv and Phillips look broadly interchangeable, but may cause damage if mixed. Pozidriv screwdrivers will jam fit into Phillips screws, but when tightened they may slip or tear out the Phillips screw head. Conversely, while Phillips screwdrivers will loosely fit and turn Pozidriv screws, they will cam out if enough torque is applied, potentially damaging the screw head or driver.

=== Supadriv ===
The Supadriv (sometimes spelled incorrectly as "Supadrive") screw drive is very similar in function and appearance to Pozidriv. It is a later development by the same company. The description of the Pozidriv head applies also to Supadriv. While each has its own driver, the same screwdriver heads may be used for both types without damage; for most purposes it is unnecessary to distinguish between the two drives. Pozidriv and Supadriv screws are slightly different in detail; the later Supadriv allows a small angular offset between the screw and the screwdriver, while Pozidriv has to be directly in line.

In detail, the Supadriv screwhead is similar to Pozidriv but has only two identification ticks, and the secondary blades are larger. Drive blades are about equally thick. The main practical difference is that Supadriv has superior bite when driving screws into vertical or near-vertical surfaces, making screwdriving more efficient, with less cam-out.

=== Phillips II ===
Phillips II recesses are compatible with Phillips drivers, but have a vertical rib in between the cruciform recesses that interacts with horizontal ribs on a Phillips II driver to create a stick-fit, and to provide anti cam-out properties (the ribs are trademarked as "ACR" for Anti Cam-out Ribs).

=== Frearson ===
Comparison between Phillips and Frearson

The Frearson screw drive, also known as the Reed and Prince screw drive, and specified as ANSI Type II Cross Recess, is similar to a Phillips but the Frearson has a sharp tip and larger angle in the V shape. One advantage over the Phillips drive is that one driver or bit fits all screw sizes. It is often found in marine hardware and requires a Frearson screwdriver or bit to work properly. The tool recess is a perfect, sharp cross, allowing for higher applied torque, unlike the rounded, tapered Phillips head, which can cam out at high torque. It was developed by an English inventor named Frearson in the 19th century and produced from the late 1930s to the mid-1970s. The Reed & Prince Mfg. Company of Worcester, Massachusetts, was put into bankruptcy in 1987 and liquidated in 1990. Another entity called Reed & Prince Manufacturing Corporation, now of Leominster, Massachusetts, purchased some of the assets including the name at the liquidation sale.

As of 2022, both Frearson screws and Frearson bits are readily available in several sizes. The available screws are made of silicon bronze.

=== French recess ===
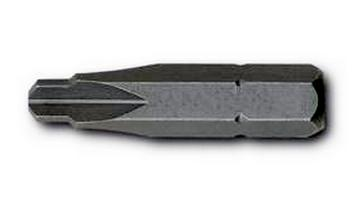
French recess driver bit

The French recess is a cruciform screw drive standardized under BNAE NFL22-070 , a norm issued by the Bureau de normalisation de l'aéronautique et de l'espace standard number. It features a distinctive two-step driver profile, where the blade diameter increases at a certain distance from the point, ensuring axial alignment and reducing cam-out under torque. This reduces over-tightening or stripping the screw which makes it particularly useful in vibration-prone environments.

Unlike other screws like Phillips or Pozidriv, which use tapered or ribbed flanks to mitigate slippage, the French recess uses mechanical depth control which prevents the driver from being inserted too deeply to achieve torque stability. This system is designed specifically for automated aerospace assembly where precision and drive engagement are key. However, it requires a matching driver to avoid damage due to incompatibility. As a result, despite its advantages its usage is largely confined to French military and aerospace manufacturing. It is not supported by ISO or ANSI standards.

=== Torq-set ===
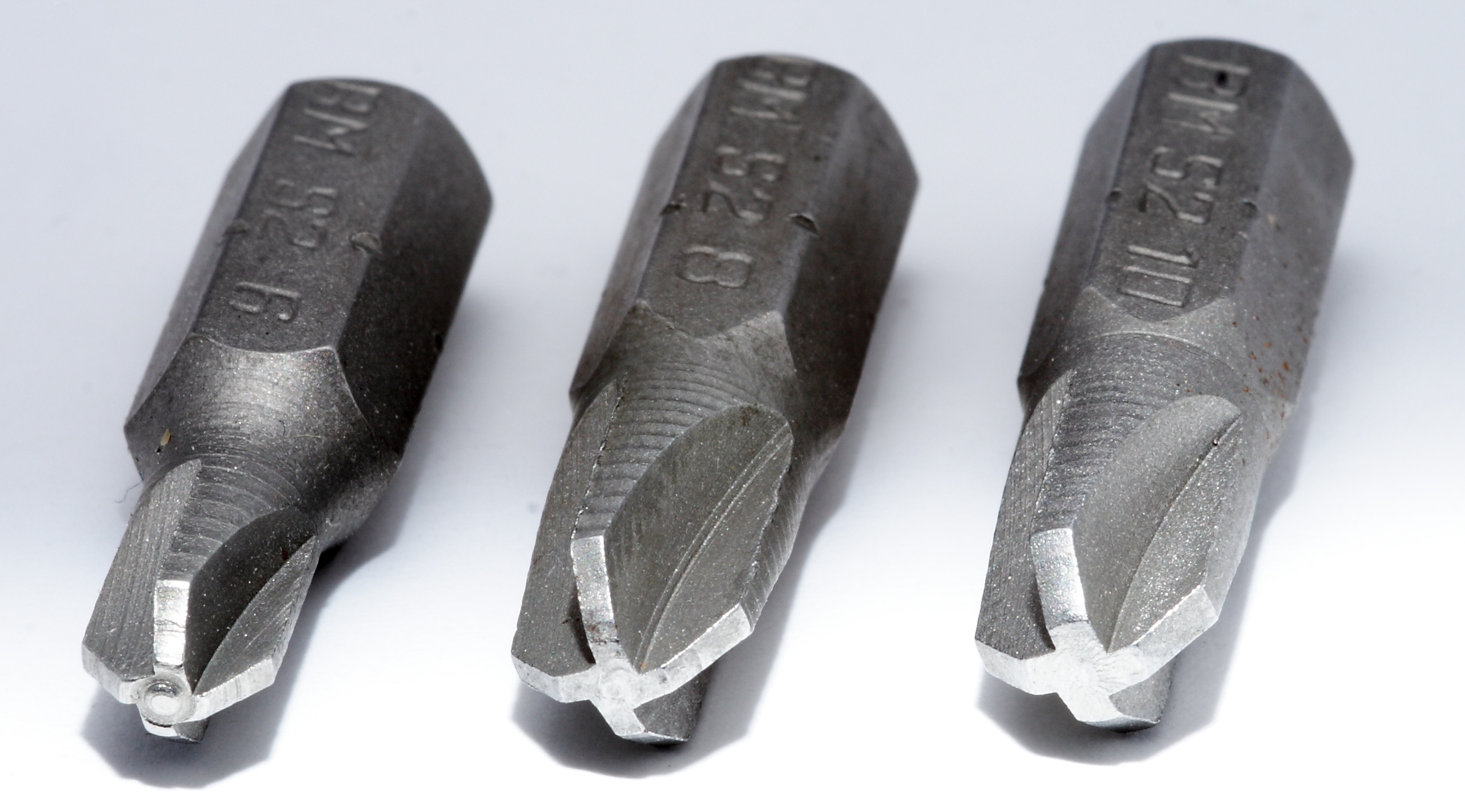
A set of torq-set bits

Torq-set is a cruciform screw drive used in torque-sensitive applications. The Torq-set head is similar in appearance to a Phillips drive in that it has a cross with 4 arms. In Torq-set however, the lines are offset from each other, so they do not align to form intersecting slots across the top of the head. Because of this, a regular Phillips or flat-blade screwdriver will not fit the head. It is used in military and aerospace applications, for example, the Boeing E-3 Sentry, Lockheed P-3 Orion, Lockheed SR-71 Blackbird, General Dynamics F-16 Fighting Falcon, Airbus, Embraer, and Bombardier Inc. aircraft. Phillips Screw Company owns the name and produces the fasteners.

The applicable standards that govern the Torq-set geometry are National Aerospace Standard NASM 33781 and NASM 14191 for the ribbed version. The ribbed version is also known as ACR Torq-set.

=== Mortorq ===
The Mortorq drive, developed by the Phillips Screw Company, is a format used in automotive and aerospace applications. It is designed to be a lightweight, low-profile and high-strength drive, with full contact over the entire recess wing, reducing risk of stripping. This low recess was able to create a shorter head height compared to other screws at the time of its development, which in turn reduced the weight of this drive type. The Mortorq was originally designed for aerospace applications. This reduction of weight within the head height was able to create lighter assemblies for many aerospace projects. The materials used in aerospace applications are expensive, and the reduction of weight cuts down on the cost of production of these parts. This will allow thinner materials to be used for the screws. The shorter head height allows more "Clearance for internal parts and more design flexibility". This allows the Mortorq drive to work in smaller and more complex builds.

==== Design and application ====
The recess and driver were designed for "full radial contact along all four wings of the screw" which helps to prevent stripping and cam-out. The straight walls in the design of the recess allow for almost all of the force of rotation to be used to drive the screw. When the bit is placed in the recess there is no wall contact until the driver is rotated, then there is full continuous contact to all four walls of the recess. The shallow recess allows for build-up and coating to occur without affecting the function of the driver. This shallow recess also grants off-angle drivability to allow work in hard-to-reach places. The design of the recess and shorter head height allows for more aesthetically pleasing work. This is in hopes that it will enhance the beauty and style of a product. Instead of covering up the screw head that it serves as an aesthetic part of the design. Ten different recess sizes are available for the Mortorq. The smallest of these, the PMT-000 can be used with screws that have a head diameter as small as 2.5 mm. While the largest called PMT-7 can be used on screws with a head diameter of 35 mm.

==== Quality assurance ====
The Phillips Screw Company owns the licensed product that is the Mortorq spiral drive system. The Phillips Screw Company must inspect and approve any punches, bits, and screws before they are cleared for production. Along with this "all licensees must submit samples regularly to ensure that the strict quality standards are maintained". Solid modeling is used for the design of the punches, bits, and screws. Files are sent over to manufacturers containing these models so that there is no miscommunication and all the parts are the same across the board.

== Square drives ==
=== Robertson ===
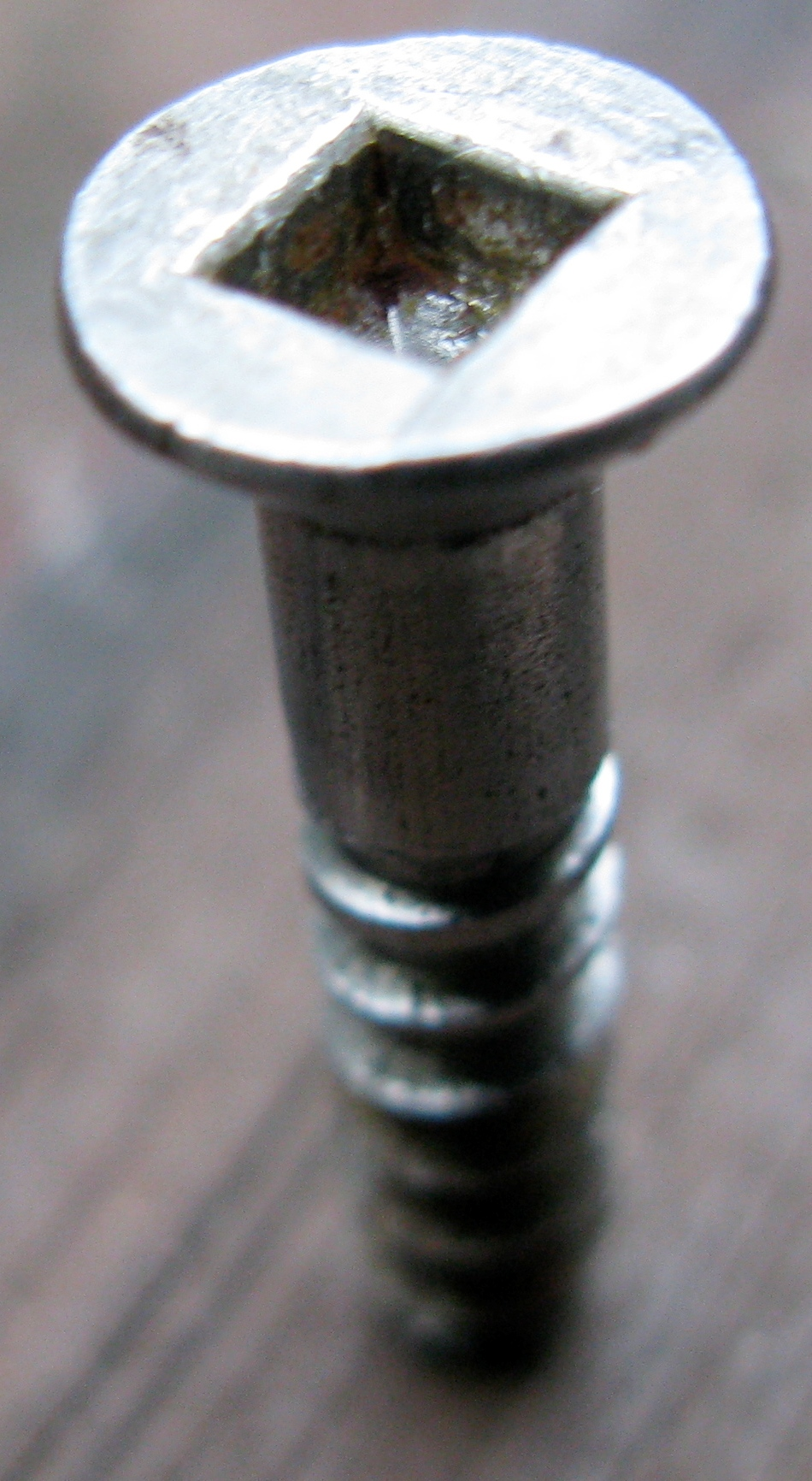
Close-up of a Robertson screw

A Robertson screw, also known as a square or Scrulox screw drive, is specified as ANSI Type III Square Center and has a square-shaped socket in the screw head and a square protrusion on the tool. Both the tool and the socket have a slight taper. Originally to make the manufacture of the screws practical using cold forming of the heads, this taper provides two other advantages which have served to popularize the drive: it makes inserting the tool easier, and tends to help keep the screw on the tool tip without the user needing to hold it there.

Robertson screws are commonplace in Canada, though they have been used elsewhere and have become much more common in other countries. As patents expired and awareness of their advantages spread, Robertson fasteners have become popular in woodworking and in general construction. Combinations of Robertson/Phillips/slot drives are often used in the electrical trade, particularly for device and circuit breaker terminals, as well as clamp connectors.

Robertson screwdrivers are easy to use one-handed, because the tapered socket tends to retain the screw, even if it is shaken. They also allow for the use of angled screw drivers and trim head screws. The socket-headed Robertson screws reduce cam-out, stop a power tool when set, and can be removed if painted over or old and rusty. In industry, they speed up production and reduce product damage.

== Multiple-square drives ==
=== LOX-Recess ===
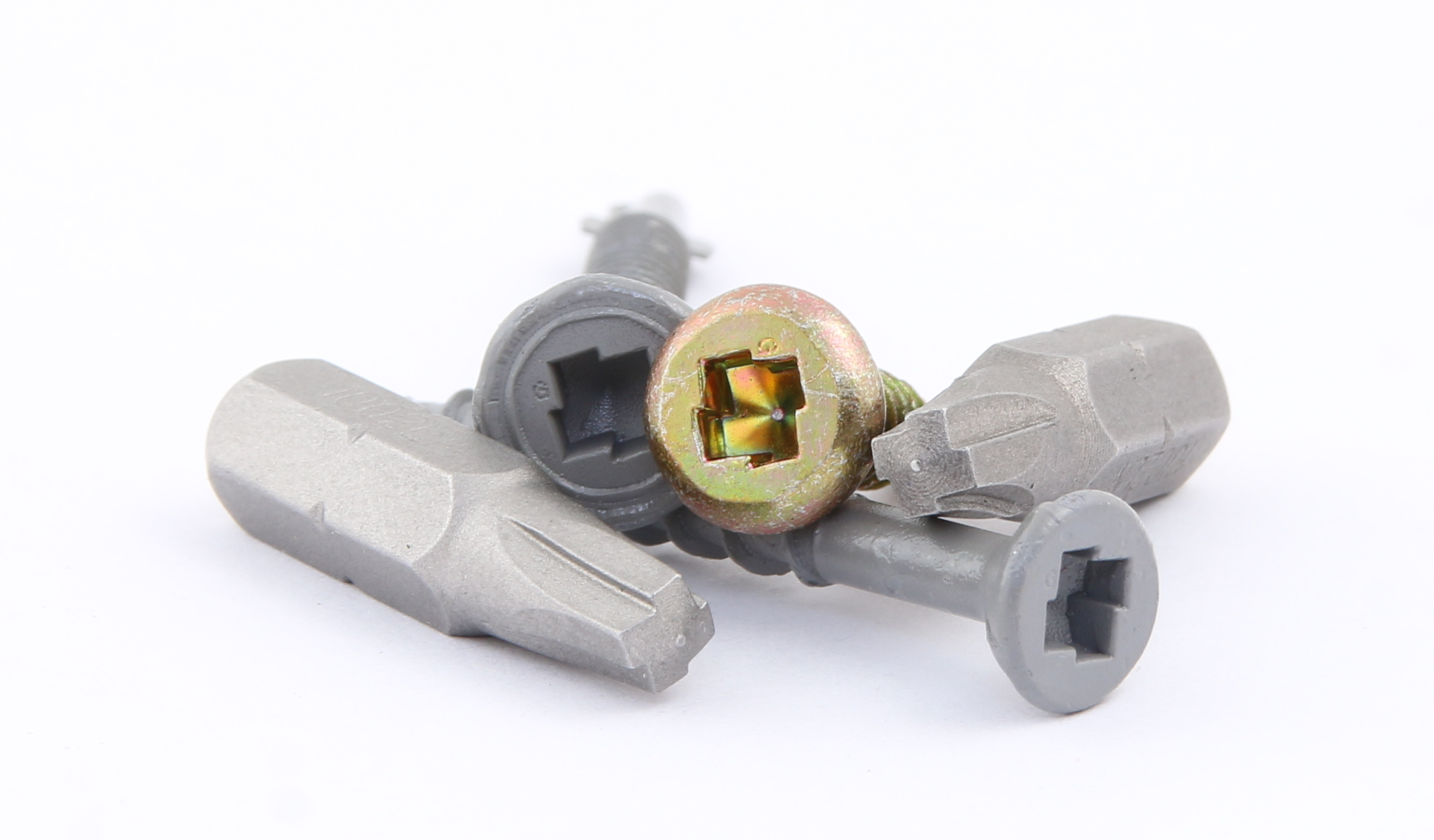
LOX type screw and bits

The LOX-Recess screw drive was invented by Brad Wagner, and fasteners using it are distributed by licensees Hitachi, Dietrick Metal Framing, and Grabber. The design is four overlapping square recesses, with 12 contact points, and is designed to tolerate more torque, decrease wear, and avoid cam-out.

=== Double-square ===
The double-square drive is two squares superimposed at 45° rotation, forming an eight-pointed star. The design is similar to a square drive (Robertson) but can be engaged at more frequent angles by the driver bit.

=== Triple-square (XZN) ===
M6 and M8 triple square drivers

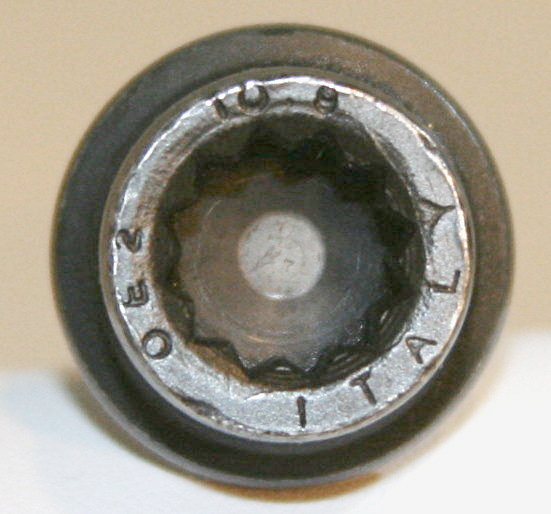
End view of M10 triple square screw

The triple-square, also known as XZN, is a type of screw drive with 12 equally spaced protrusions, each ending in a 90° internal angle. The name derives from overlaying three equal squares to form such a pattern with 12 right-angled protrusions (a 12-pointed star). In other words, three Robertson squares are superimposed at a successive 30° rotation. The design is similar to that of the double-square, in both cases the idea being that it resembles a square (Robertson) but can be engaged at more frequent angles by the driver bit. These screws can be driven with standard Robertson bits.

Sizes are: M4, M5, M6, (M7), M8, (M9), M10, (M11), M12, (M13), M14, (M15), M16, (M17) and M18 (the sizes in parentheses are less commonly used, but they do exist). Despite the similar naming scheme to metric fasteners, there is no correlation between the name of the size and the dimensions of the tool. Some sizes (at least M14, M16, M18) are also available in a tamperproof version (with a center hole)

Difference between 12-spline screw heads: 120° / Double hex; 90° / Triple square (XZN); 60° / 12-spline flange

The 12-pointed internal star shape superficially resembles the "double hex" fastener head but differs subtly in that the points are shaped to an internal angle of 90° (derived from a square), rather than the 120° internal angle of a hexagon. In practice, drivers for the fasteners may be interchangeable but should be examined carefully for proper fit before application of force. A hex key should not be used where a key of square cross-section is the correct fit.

Triple-square fasteners are referred to as "spline" in the UK. This is potentially confusing if looking for the more unusual 12-spline flange type. While they are distinguished under close inspection by the angle at the tip of each of the 12 points (with a 90° angle on the XZN, instead of 60°) the general similarity and ability to insert the wrong tool can cause damage to the head.

Triple-square drive fasteners have been used in high-torque applications, such as cylinder head bolts and drive train components. The fasteners involved have heads that are hardened and tempered to withstand the driving torque without destroying the star points. They are commonly found on German vehicles such as BMW, Opel, Mercedes, and those from the Volkswagen Group (Porsche, Audi, Seat, Skoda, and Volkswagen).

== Internal hex drives ==
=== Hex socket ===
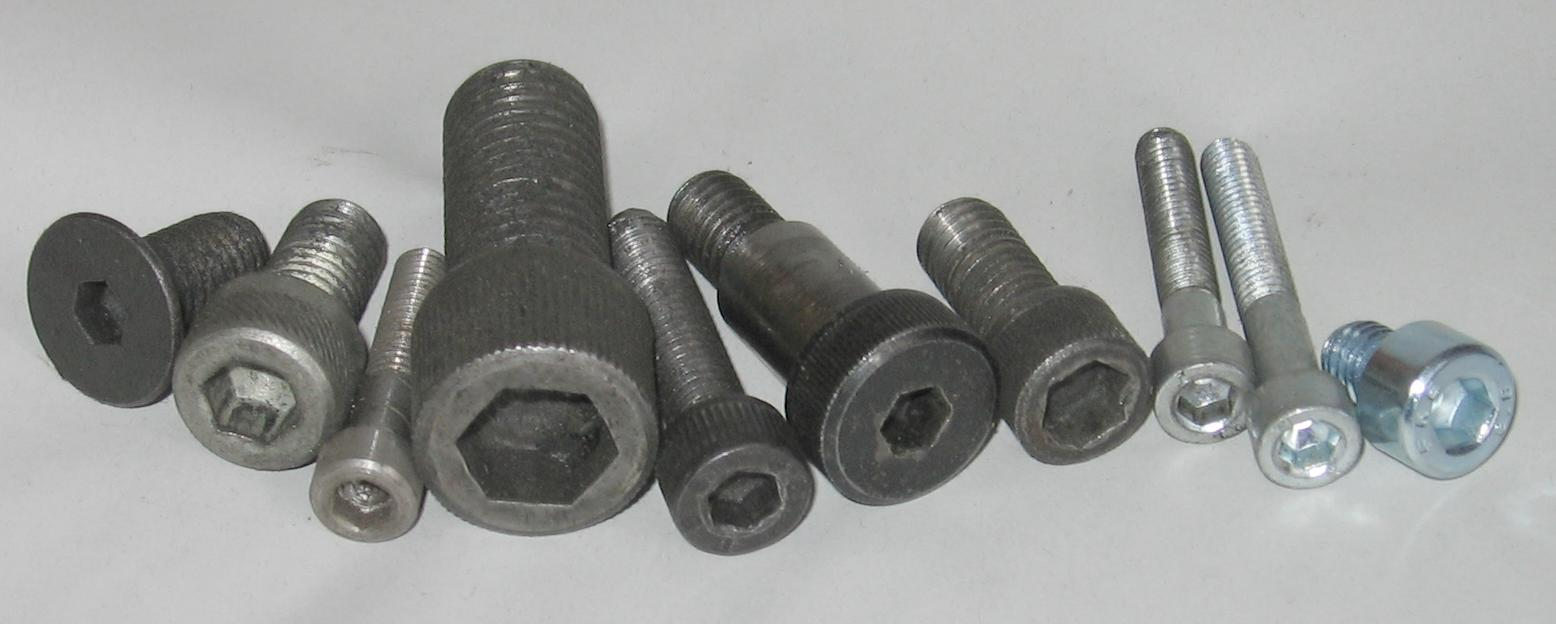
Hex socket screws

The hex socket screw drive has a hexagonal recess and may be driven by a hex wrench, also known as an Allen wrench, Allen key, hex key, or inbus as well as by a hex screwdriver (also known as a hex driver) or bit. Tamper-resistant versions with a pin in the recess are available. Metric sizes of the hex socket are defined by ISO 4762 (socket head cap screws), ISO 4026 (socket set screws with flat point), ISO 4027 (socket set screws with cone point), ISO 4028 (socket set screws with dog point), and ISO 4029 (socket set screws with cup point).

The German company Bauer & Schaurte patented the hex socket 1936 in Germany, and marketed products based on it. The term "inbus" is derived from Innensechskant Bauer u. Schaurte (German: "Inner 6-edge Bauer & Schaurte"), analogous to the US term "Allen key". In Denmark the format is generally called Unbrako.

=== Double hex ===
Double hex is a screw drive with a socket shaped as two coaxial offset hex recesses; it can be driven by standard hex key tools. The shape resembles triple square and spline screw drives, but they are incompatible.

The radial "height" of each arris is reduced, compared to a six-point, although their number is doubled. They are potentially capable of allowing more torque than a six-point, but greater demands are placed on the metallurgy of the heads and the tools used, to avoid rounding off and slippage.

The shape of a double hex head is equivalent to that of a 2{6} regular dodecagram.

== Pentalobular sockets ==
=== Pentalobe ===
The pentalobe screw drive is a five-pointed tamper-resistant system implemented by Apple in its products. Apple's first use of the pentalobe drive was in mid-2009 to secure the battery in the MacBook Pro. Smaller versions are now used on the iPhone 4 and subsequent models, the MacBook Air (since the late 2010 model), the MacBook Pro with Retina Display and the 2015 MacBook. Pentalobe screw sizes include TS1 (also known as P2 or 0.8 mm, used on the iPhone 4 and subsequent models), TS4 (also known as P5 or 1.2 mm, used on the MacBook Air [since late 2010], the MacBook Pro with Retina Display and the 2015 MacBook) and TS5 (also known as P6 or 1.5 mm, used on the 2009 MacBook Pro battery). The TS designation is ambiguous as it is also used for a Torq-set screw drive.

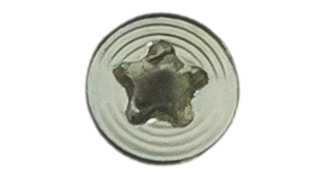
Pentalobe screw from an iPhone.

=== ASTER recess ===
The ASTER recess was designed by LISI Aerospace to provide a more reliable solution than the hexagonal recess for assemblies of composite structures on aircraft. This recess is optimized to fit on the threaded end of aerospace fasteners, allowing for higher torque and fewer issues with damage to the fastener or tool.

== Hexalobular (Torx) ==
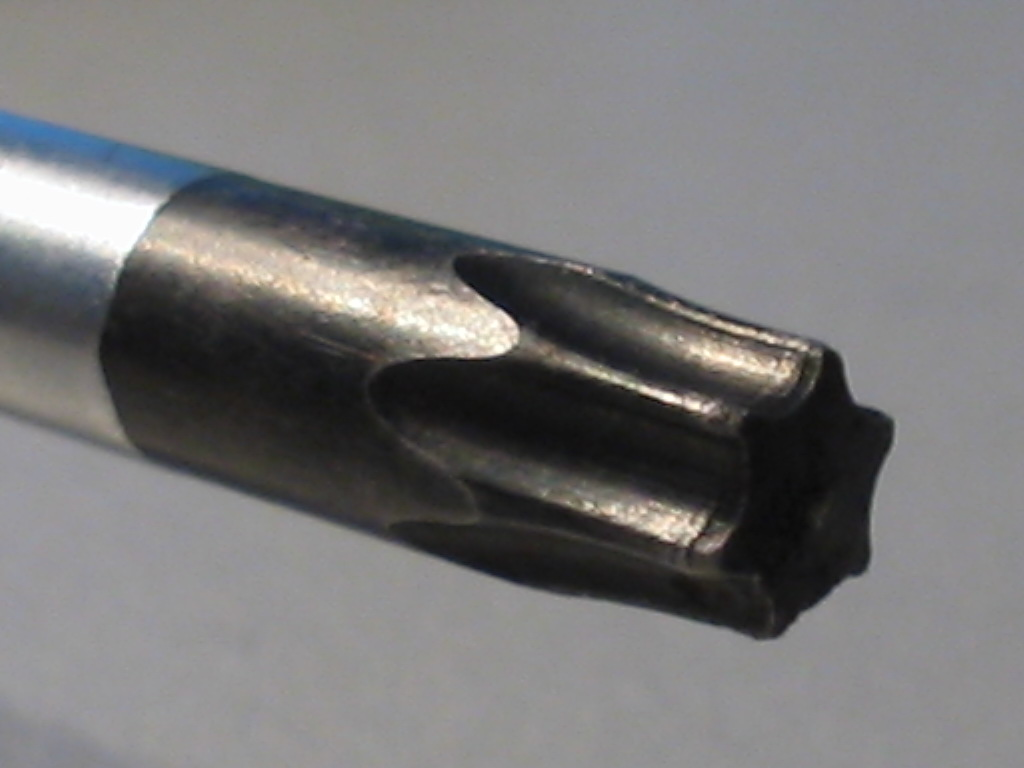
Torx driver

=== Torx ===
The hexalobular socket screw drive, often referred to by the original proprietary brand name Torx ( /ˈtɔːrks/) or by the alternative generic name star drive, uses a star-shaped recess in the fastener with six rounded points. It was designed to permit increased torque transfer from the driver to the bit compared to other drive systems. The drive was developed in 1967 by Camcar Textron. Torx is very popular in the automotive and electronics industries because of resistance to cam-out and extended bit life, as well as reduced operator fatigue by minimizing the need to bear down on the drive tool to prevent cam-out. A tamper-resistant Security Torx head has a small pin inside the recess. Owing to its six-fold symmetry, a Torx driver can also be used as an improvised substitute for a hex driver, although careful sizing is critical to prevent stripping the socket.

=== Torx Plus ===
Torx Plus is an improved version of Torx that extends tool life even further and permits greater torque transfer compared to Torx. An External Torx version exists, where the screw head has the shape of a Torx screwdriver bit, and a Torx socket is used to drive it.

=== Torx Paralobe ===
Torx Paralobe is a further improvement over Torx Plus, claiming 50% increased drive system torque over Torx and 20% over Torx Plus.

=== Torx ttap ===
Torx ttap is a version of Torx that reduces wobbling between the fastener and the tool, and is backward compatible with standard hexalobular tools. As early as 2005, the German screw manufacturer Altenloh, Brinck & Co introduced a similar driver design under the trade name Spax T-Star plus.

== Spline socket ==
Spline socket driver sizes
Driver size
in	mm	flutes	in	mm	flutes
0.033	0.84	4 flutes	0.168	4.3	6 flutes
0.048	1.2	4 & 6 flutes	0.183	4.6	6 flutes
0.060	1.5	6 flutes	0.216	5.5	6 flutes
0.069	1.8	4 flutes	0.216 OS	5.5	6 flutes
0.072	1.8	6 flutes	0.251	6.4	6 flutes
0.076	1.9	4 flutes	0.291	7.4	6 flutes
0.096	2.4	6 flutes	0.372	9.4	6 flutes
0.111	2.8	6 flutes	0.454	11.5	6 flutes
0.133	3.4	6 flutes	0.595	15.1	6 flutes
0.145	3.7	6 flutes			

The spline socket (alternatively known as Bristo, Bristol, Bristol spline, multiple-spline and fluted) screw drive features four or six splines. Almost all of the force of the key or driver is applied normal to the sides of the splines. Little force tending to expand the socket is exerted, unlike the hexagon socket design, making the spline socket preferable for fasteners made of lower strength materials and in setscrews due to reduced tendency of the setscrew to bind. The spline socket is also preferred over the hexagon socket in screws that must be subjected to high driving torque and in applications requiring high reliability of the fastener. Compared to the hexagon socket drive, spline socket drives are less likely to strip for the same amount of torque; however, the spline socket drive is not much more strip-resistant than a Torx drive.

As a makeshift if the correct spline key is not available, a spline socket screw can be turned with any screwdriver designed to drive slotted screws that fits into the socket such that the width of the blade occupies the major diameter of the socket and the thickness of the blade permits it to fit between adjacent splines. This makeshift does not permit as much torque to be applied to the screw as can be applied with the correct spline key, due to concentration of stress that can damage the socket or screwdriver.

The spline socket drive system was patented in the United States in 1913 by Dwight S. Goodwin and initially produced by the Goodwin Hollow Set Screw Company. Spline socket screws are used in avionics, high reliability applications, cameras, air brakes, construction and farm equipment and astronomy equipment.

SpiderDrive

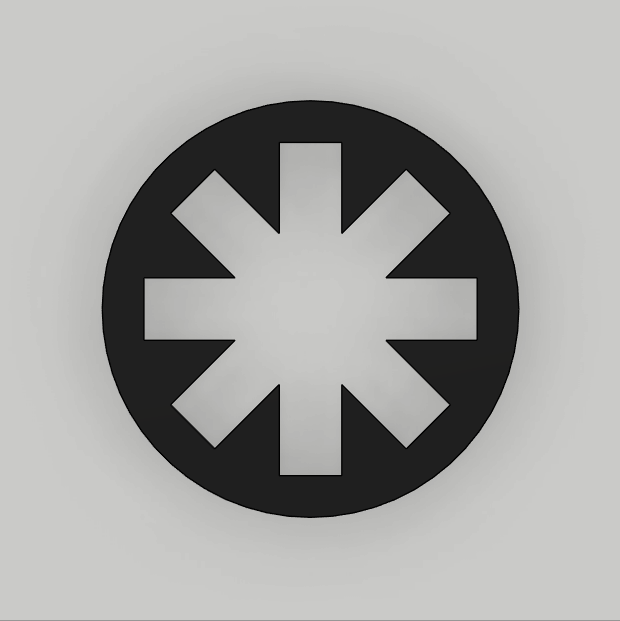
8-spline SpiderDrive

The SpiderDrive is an 8-pointed variant of spline drive employed by FastenMaster in some of their HeadLOK line of structural wood screws. The SpiderDrive is a true spline-type, not a double-square, but with 8 points instead of 6. There is a single standard size for SpiderDrive. Although once more common, the limited applications of SpiderDrive appear to have been largely replaced by TorxPlus.

== Combination drives ==
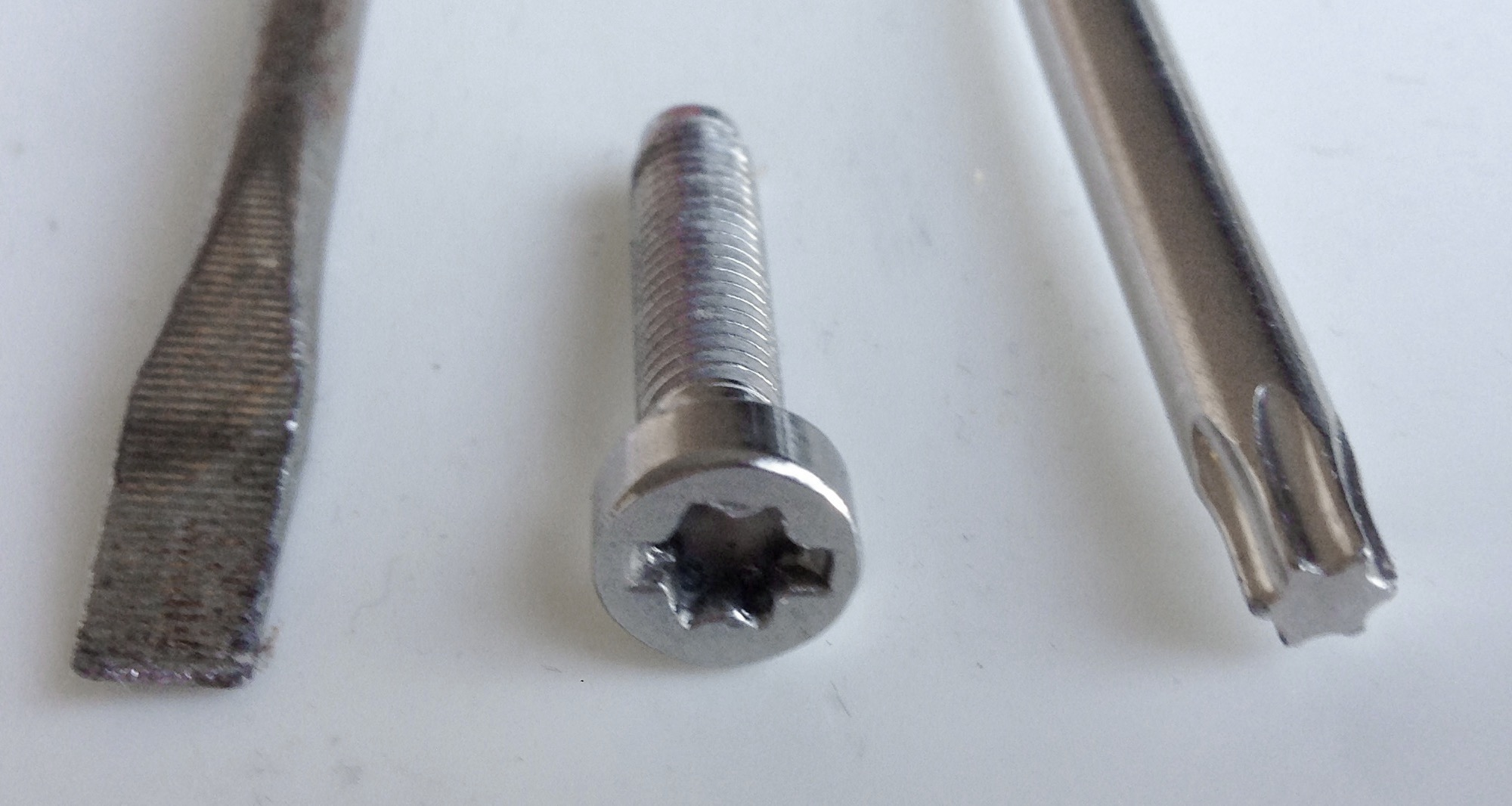
Example of a combination drive system. At center, a Torx T25/slot Dual Drive screw; at left, a 3/16-inch (4.8 mm) flat-blade screwdriver; at right, a T25 screwdriver. The screw will accept either screwdriver.

Some screws have heads designed to accommodate more than one kind of driver, sometimes referred to as combo-head or combi-head. The most common of these are a combination of a slotted/Phillips head.

Other combinations are a Phillips and Robertson, a Robertson and a slotted, a Torx and a slotted and a triple-drive screw that can take a slotted, Phillips or a Robertson.

In some cases a combination head can be driven by either of two types of driver, but best results are obtained with a special driver for the specific combination head.

=== Slotted/Phillips ===
The Slotted/Phillips (PH/S or SL/PH), also called plus-minus head, is often used in attaching knobs to furniture drawer fronts. These screws are made with heads designed to accept either cruciform or slotted screwdrivers; the idea is that first screwdriver out of the toolbox is used, and the user does not have to waste valuable time searching for the correct driver. Slotted/Phillips heads are used in some North American-made switchgear. Disadvantages include that the head is weaker and neither a flat screwdriver nor Phillips screwdriver is fully successful in driving these screws to the required torque. Instead, a less common PH/S screwdriver or bit designed specifically for this sort of head is needed.

=== Slotted/Pozidriv ===
The Slotted/Pozidriv (SL/PZ) uses the same idea as the Slotted/Phillips (PH/S): either a Pozidriv or slotted screwdriver can be used. Combined slotted/pozidriv heads are so ubiquitous in electrical devices, that they have earned the nickname "electrician's screws". This system has the same advantages (compatibility) and disadvantages (weakness unless special screwdrivers are used).

=== ACR Phillips II Plus ===
ACR Phillips II Plus is a screw-drive design that can be driven by a #2 Phillips driver or a #2 Robertson driver, but when driven by a Phillips II Plus Bit, the combination results in a stick-fit interface.

=== Phillips/square ===
The Phillips/square screw drive, also known as the Quadrex, Pozisquare screw drive, is a combination of the Phillips and Robertson screw drives. While a standard Phillips or Robertson tool can be used, there is also a dedicated tool for it that increases the surface area between the tool and the fastener so it can handle more torque.

=== Recex ===
The Recex drive system claims it offers the combined non-slip convenience of a Robertson drive during production assembly and Phillips for after market serviceability. The Phillips Screw Company offers both Phillips and Pozidriv combo heads with Robertson.

=== Slotted/Torx ===
A combined slotted and Torx drive screw was used in electronics manufacturing, and is still used by some companies. For example, Compaq, HP, and Hewlett Packard Enterprise (HPE) use this type to combine the benefits of Torx in manufacturing and the commonality of flat drive in field repair situations.

=== Slotted/Square ===
Also known as an ECX or Combination Tip drive. A combined slotted and Robertson drive screw found in electrical power equipment and distribution equipment. The design allows for higher torque application with reduced camming, slipping out and damaging the fastener. The ECX drive is not compatible with older combination Phillips and slotted head screws. Although Milwaukee Electric Tool holds the trade name ECX, their marketing materials do not tell what type of screw head ECX is designed to fit.

=== Clutch ===
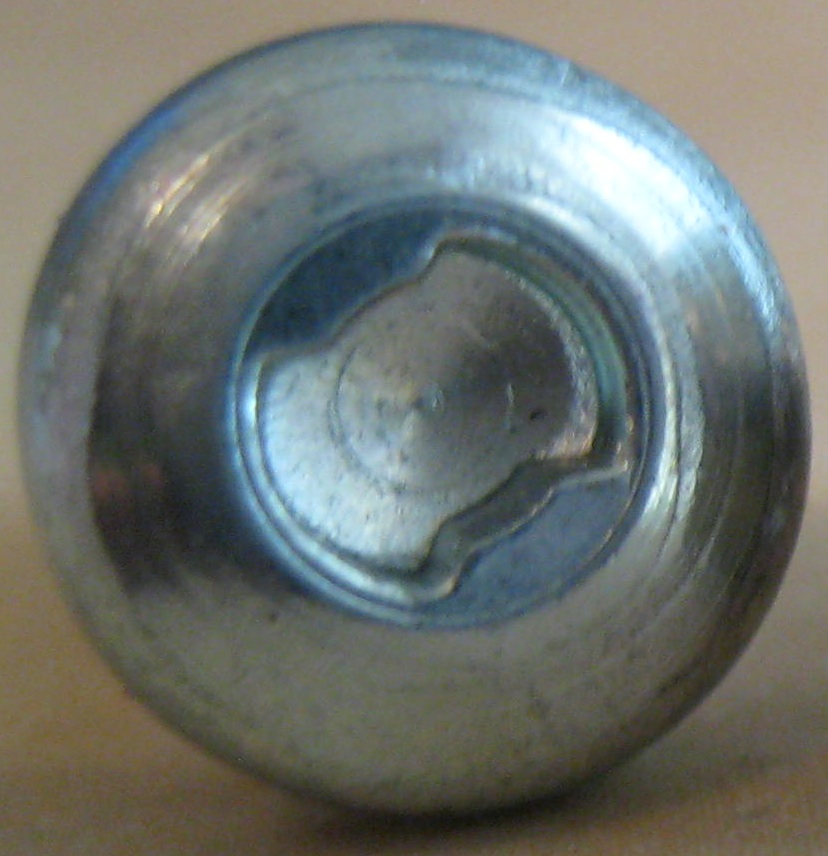
Type A

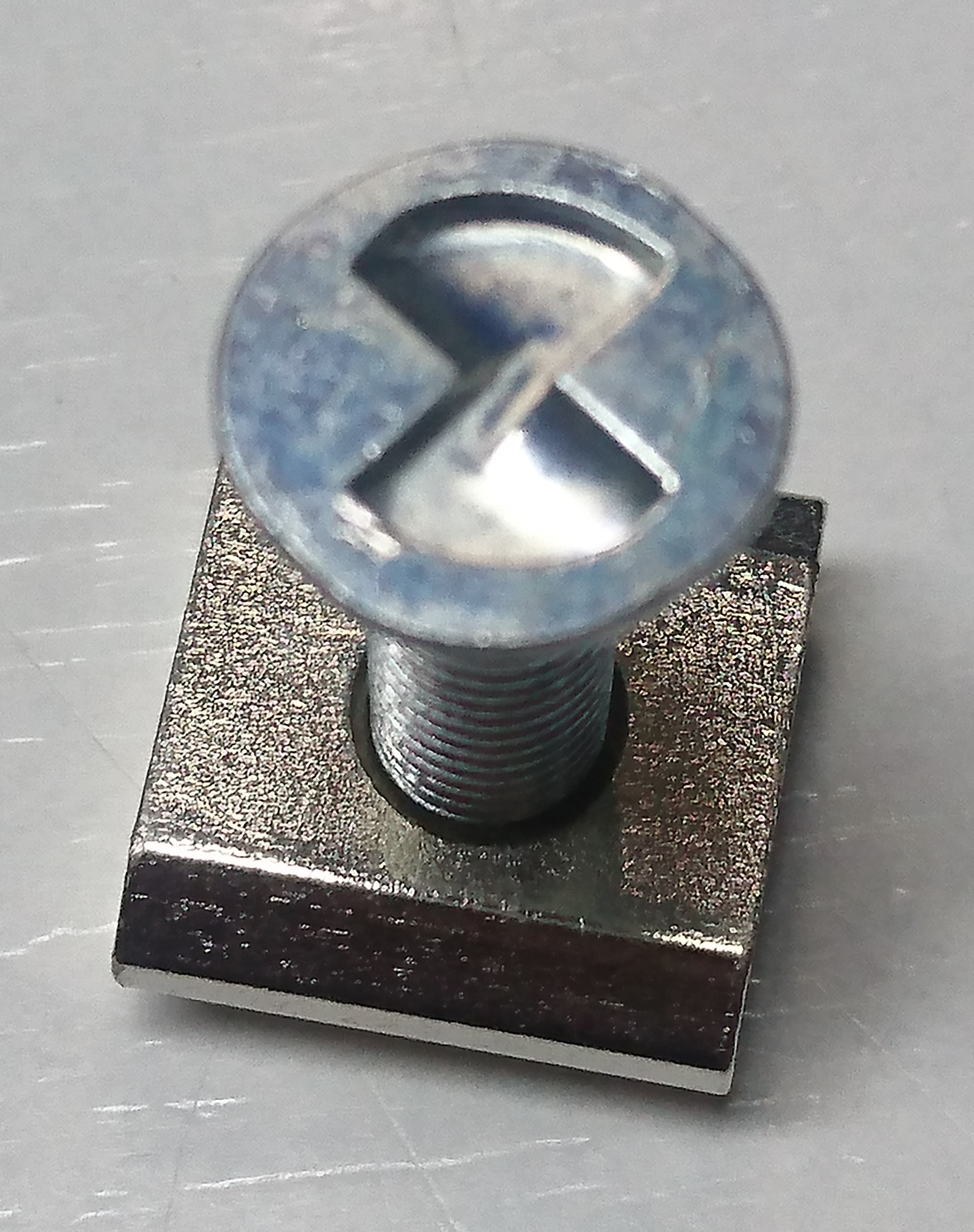
Type G

There are two types of clutch screw drives: Type G and Type A (Type G was patented and introduced before Type A). Type A, also known as a "standard clutch", resembles a bow tie, with a small circular "knot" at the center. These were common in GM automobiles, trucks and buses of the 1940s and 1950s. Type G resembles a butterfly, and lacks the center "knot". This type of screw head is commonly used in the manufacture of mobile homes and recreational vehicles. The clutch head was designed to be driven either with a flat-blade screwdriver or a clutch driver; but the screws are tamper-proof and secure, and cannot be unscrewed with a normal slotted screwdriver.

=== Thumbscrew ===
A thumbscrew is a type of screw drive with either a tall head and ridged or knurled sides, or a key-like flat-sided vertical head. They are intended to be tightened and loosened with the bare hand, and are usually not found in structural applications. They are sometimes also cut for Phillips head or slotted screwdrivers, as well as having the knurling for finger grip. ASME Standard 18.6.8 covers dimensions for Type A (shoulder under the head), regular and heavy, along with Type B (without shoulder), regular and heavy. They can be found on many computer cases, and in other locations where easy access without tools is desired.

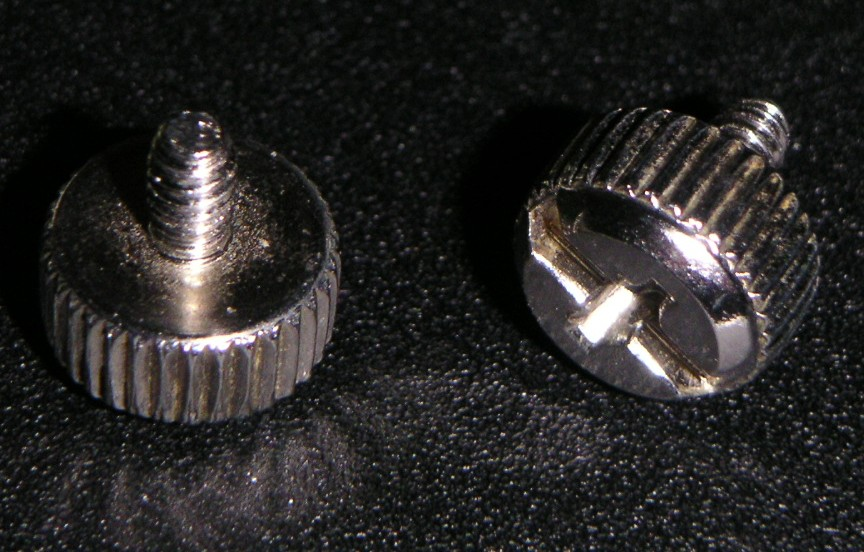
#6-32 UNC thumbscrew (computer case screw)

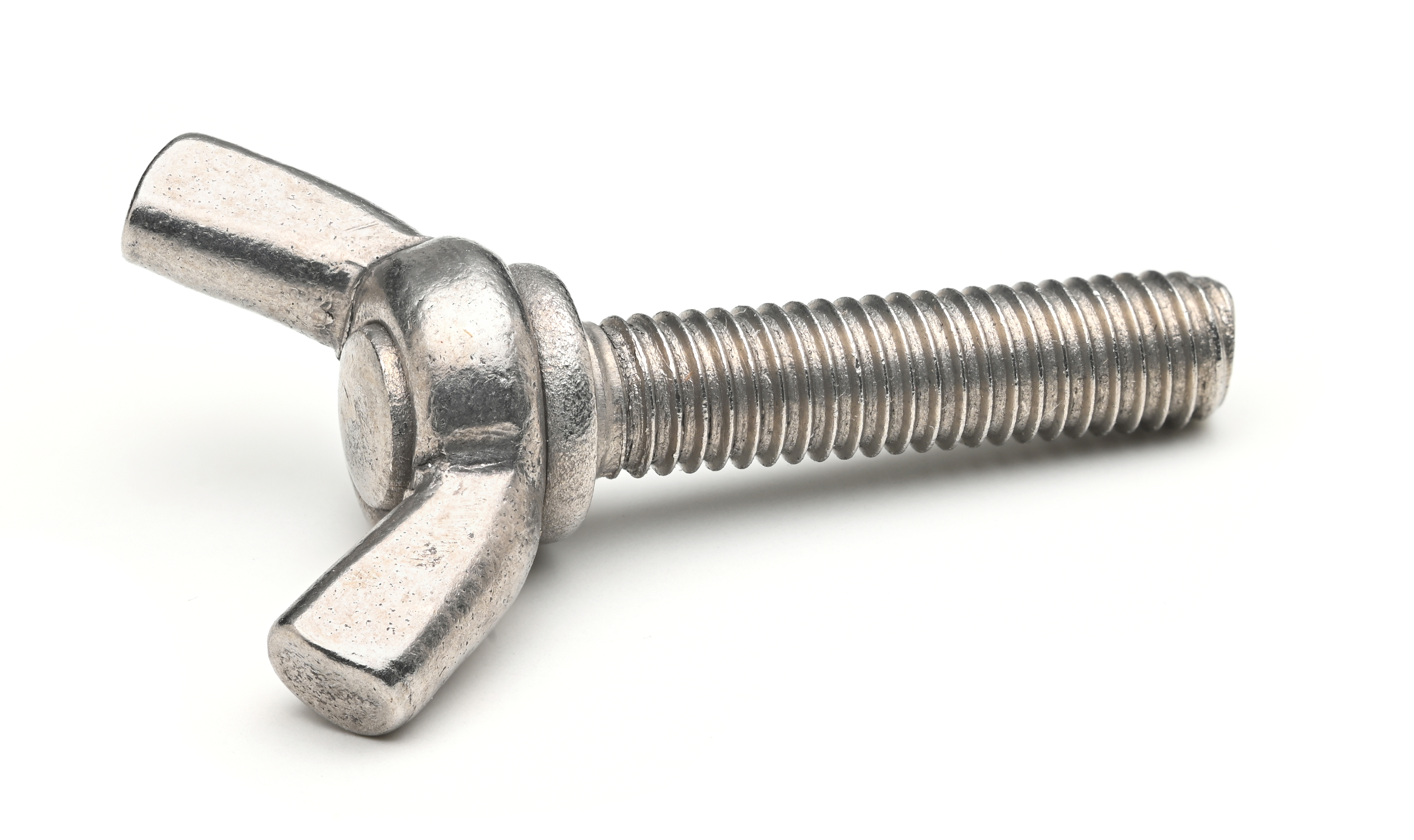
Metric wingbolt, M5×30

== External drives ==
External drives are characterized by a female tool and a male fastener. An advantage of external drive fasteners is that they lack a recess in the head, which can collect water, dirt, or paint, which can interfere with later insertion of a driver tool. Also, some external drives can be engaged from the side, without requiring large inline clearance for tool access, which allows their use in tight spaces such as engines or complex pipework. Because the heads must stand out from the surface they attach to, they are rarely available in countersunk or flush designs.

=== Square ===
A square screw drive uses four-sided fastener heads which can be turned with an adjustable wrench, open-end wrench, or 8- or 12-point sockets. Common in the 19th and early 20th centuries, when it was easier and cheaper to manufacture than most other drives, it is less common today (although still easy to find) because the external hex is now cost-competitive and allows better access for wrenching despite nearby obstructions.

=== Hex ===
A hex screw drive uses six-sided fastener heads, and the fastener is known as a hex head cap screw. It can be turned with an adjustable wrench, combination wrench and 6- or 12-point sockets. The hex drive is better than square drive for locations where surrounding obstacles limit wrenching access, because smaller wrench-swing arcs can still successfully rotate the fastener. Metric sizes of the hex are specified by ISO 4032 and ISO 4033, plus ISO 4035 for Jam Nuts, and ISO 4014 and ISO 4017 for hex cap screws, ISO 4018 for Hex head screws (grade c).

=== Slotted Hex ===
A combination slotted/hex head cap is often used for self-tapping sheet metal screws, where the hex head enables greater torque during the initial self-tapping installation, while allowing the convenience of a slotted screwdriver to be used for removal and reinsertion.

=== Pentagon ===
A pentagon screw drive uses five-sided fastener heads, and the fastener is known as a penta screw or penta bolt. It is designed to be intrinsically incompatible with many tools. Since five is an odd number, it cannot be turned by open-end or adjustable wrenches, which have parallel faces (and thus require a fastener with an even number of sides). Moreover, it cannot be turned by typical consumer-grade and professional-grade socket drivers, which possess either six or twelve points (neither of which are multiples of five). Penta nut security fasteners also are available, which can only be driven by specialized five-sided socket drivers. However, the security feature of this design can be bypassed by using some type of pliers if enough force is applied.

Due to the difficulty of turning these fasteners without specialized (and uncommon) five-point wrenches such as hydrant wrenches, they are commonly used for tamper resistance by public utilities on water meter covers, natural gas valves, electrical cabinets, and fire hydrants.

=== External Torx ===
An external Torx screw has a projecting head in the shape of a Torx screwdriver bit (instead of a standard recessed cavity); a Torx socket is used to drive it. The external "E" Torx nominal sizing does not correspond to the "T" size (for example, an E40 socket is too large to fit a T40, while an E8 Torx socket will fit a T40 Torx bit). These screws are most commonly encountered in the automotive industry.

=== 12-point ===
A 12-point screw drive uses two overlapped hexagon shapes, one rotated by 30°. Standard 12-point hex socket bits and wrenches fit these screws. The screw heads are typically flanged, and may fit into standard Allen hex socket cap screw counterbores molded or machined into parts to be fastened. Compared to Allen hex sockets, the advantages of these bolts include higher torque capability and the lack of a recess to trap water. A disadvantage is the extra cost involved in forming the heads.

== Tamper-resistant types ==
A set of secure or otherwise less common screwdriver bits, including secure Torx and secure hex or allen variants

Most tamper-resistant screw configurations rely on the common unavailability of corresponding drivers to reduce the likelihood of widespread tampering. True tamper-proof—rather than merely tamper-resistant—screw drives include the breakaway head and one-way screw drives.

Both tamper-proof and tamper-resistant drives are commonly used in vandalism- and attack-prone areas, such as public restrooms, prisons, and banks; tamper-resistant in similar applications, and on equipment such as home electronics, to prevent unauthorised access and repairs. Drive bits for most standard security types have become available, making them secure only against casual adversaries not equipped with security bits. It is of course always possible to design new drives resistant to existing drivers available to unauthorised users, until they too are developed.

In addition to screw drives, various nut drives have been designed to make removal difficult without specialized tools. Proprietary examples include T-Groove, Slot-Lok, Pentagon, Tork-Nut, T-Slope and Spanner designs.

=== Breakaway head ===
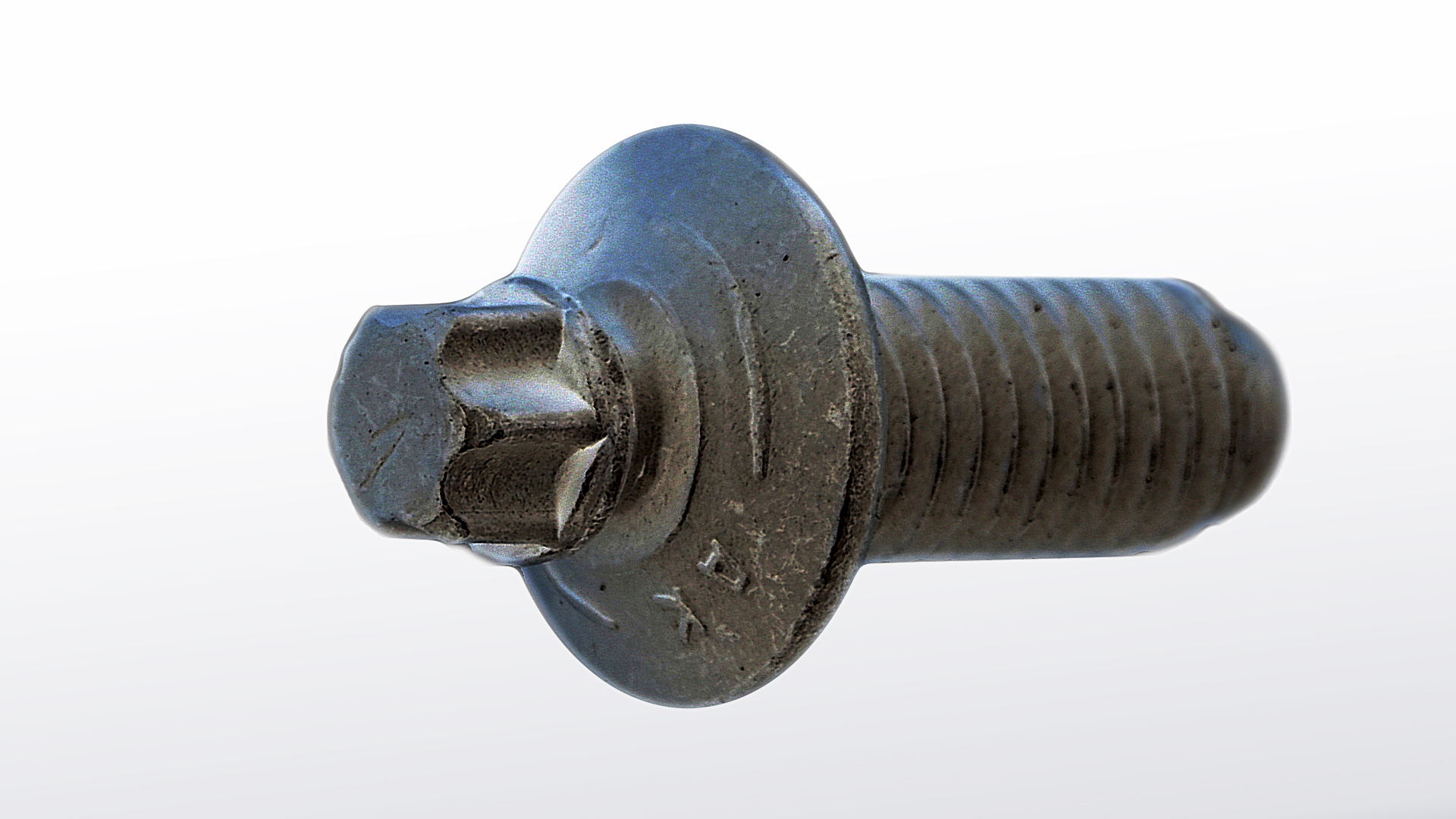
Breakaway head

The breakaway head (also called breakoff or shear fastener) is a high-security fastener whose head breaks off during installation, during or immediately after the driving process, to leave only a smooth surface. It typically consists of a countersunk flat-head bolt, with a thin shank and hex head protruding from the flat head. The hex head is used to drive the bolt into the countersunk hole, then either a wrench or hammer is used to break the shank and hex head from the flat head, or it is driven until the driving head shears off. Either method leaves only a smooth bolt head exposed. This type of bolt is commonly used with prison door locks, automobile ignition switches, and street signs, to prevent easy removal. An alternative design leaves a low-profile button head visible after installation. In addition to breakaway bolts, breakaway nuts of similar design are available.

In non-security applications, a breakaway head fastener is sometimes used as a crude torque limiter, intended to break off at an approximate torque limit. For example, certain toilet seat fastener bolts use a breakaway plastic nut, with the driver part intended to shear at a torque high enough to prevent wobbling, while not shattering the porcelain toilet from excessive pressure. Breakaway fasteners used in a non-security application may have a second driveable surface (such as a hex head) to allow later removal or adjustment of the fastener after the initial breakaway installation.

This drive type has the disadvantage of not being as precisely controlled as can be obtained by proper use of a torque wrench; applications may still fail due to either too little torque being applied to correctly fasten the joint, or too much torque being required to shear the head, resulting in damage to the material being fastened.

=== Line Head and Line Recess ===
Line head driver sizes
Internal	External	Tamper-resistant
ALR2	ALH2	
ALR3	ALH3	ALR3T
ALR4	ALH4	ALR4T
ALR5	ALH5	ALR5T
ALR6	ALH6	ALR6T

Line Head and Line Recess screw drives are Japanese systems with male, female and tamper-resistant configurations.

The fasteners are commonly called line head screws. They are also known as Gamebit screws, due to their use on some video game consoles. They are found on IBM computers such as the PS/2, as well as Nintendo and Sega systems and their game cartridges. The female sizes are designated ALR2, ALR3, ALR4, ALR5, ALR6; the male sizes are designated with an "H" instead of an "R"; and the tamper-resistant female have a "T" at the end of the designation (e.g. ALR3T).

In Japan, the male sizes are often designated as DTC-20, DTC-27, DTC-40 (discontinued) and DTC-45 corresponding to a respective screw head size of 3.2 mm, 4.6 mm, 6.4 mm and 7.7 mm; with the size of the screw measured across the widest portion of the mating part of the head. The most common sizes in use for consumer electronics are DTC-20 and DTC-27.

=== One-way ===
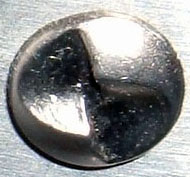
A one-way slotted screw

One-way screws are special screws that can be turned only in one direction. They are sometimes called one-way clutch screws, but should not be confused with true "clutch" screws. They can be installed with a standard flat-blade screwdriver, but cannot be easily removed using standard tools. One-way screws are commonly used in commercial restroom fixtures and on vehicle registration plates, to prevent unauthorised tampering.

One-way screws are relevant only when the need for removal is unlikely. They are difficult to remove with conventional tools because the slot is designed to cause cam-out when even minimal torque is applied in the direction to unscrew it. Instead, a one-way screw can be removed by drilling a hole through the head of the screw and inserting a screw extractor. Alternatively, a rotary tool with cutting disk can be used to extend the slot, the head can be gripped with locking pliers, or the screw can be removed with a pin spanner (snake-eyes driver) after drilling two holes in the slot. A screw (with any head, not drivable for any reason such as damage) that is standing proud of a surface can sometimes be removed by attaching a drill chuck, which might sustain damage, tightly to the screw head.

=== Oval ===
Some consumer appliances, such as espresso machines from Jura Elektroapparate, use a proprietary screw head with an eccentric oval to discourage owners from servicing their machines.

=== Polydrive ===
The polydrive screw drive, also known as RIBE, is spline-shaped with rounded ends in the fastener head. The tool has six flat teeth at equal spacing; the sizes are determined by the diameter of the star points. Its primary advantage over older screw drives is that it resists cam-out. It is used primarily in the automotive industry in high-torque applications, such as brakes and driveshafts.

=== Proprietary head ===
There are specialty fastener companies that make unusual, proprietary head designs, such as Slot-Lok and Avsafe. These use special circular or oval cam-shaped heads that require complementary socket drivers.

For further security, there are custom-designed fastener heads requiring matching drivers available only from the manufacturer and only supplied to registered owners, similar to keyed locks.

The Ultra-Lok, and Ultra-Lok II are some of these designs that use custom keyed drivers, which tend to be confined to industrial and institutional uses that are unavailable to the average layperson. Key-Rex screws are another design, and are used in such things as ballot boxes and bank vaults.

One example familiar to laypersons is for the attachment of wheels and spare tires of passenger vehicles to deter theft; one of the lug nuts on each wheel may require a specialized socket provided with the set of lug nuts. Similar security fasteners are also available for bicycle wheels and seats.

=== Security hex ===
A security hex screw drive features an extruded pin to make the fastener more tamper resistant by inserting a pin in the center of the female socket, requiring a tool with a corresponding hole to drive the fastener. This can also prevent attempts at turning the screw with a small flat-bladed screwdriver.

=== Security Torx ===
A security Torx screw drive is a common modification to socket and cruciform style drives to make the fastener more tamper resistant by inserting a pin in the center of the female socket, requiring a tool with a corresponding hole to drive the fastener. This can also prevent attempts at turning the screw with a small flat-bladed screwdriver.

=== Spanner ===
The spanner or Snake-Eyes (trademarked) screw drive uses two round holes (sometimes two slots; the same driver bits work in both types) opposite each other and is designed to prevent tampering. Other informal names include pig nose, drilled head or twin hole. This type is often seen in elevators and restrooms in the United States, the London Underground in the United Kingdom, some train wagons and the Montreal Metro in Montreal, Quebec, and is seen in all Panama Metro wagons. The driving tool is called a "spanner driver" or "spanner screwdriver" in the US, and a "pin spanner" in the UK. They are also often used for soft spikes on golf shoes. The US military's M17 and M18 service pistols (variants of the SIG Sauer P320) use spanner screws to dissuade disassembly of the handgun beyond normal field maintenance except by the authorized armorer; they have also been used previously for reinforcement screws on the M14 rifle in order to secure the front locking tab on the magazine well, and are commonly found on the recoil lug of surplus rifles. Additionally many firearm trigger locks are simply spanner screws, with the appropriate driver serving as the key.

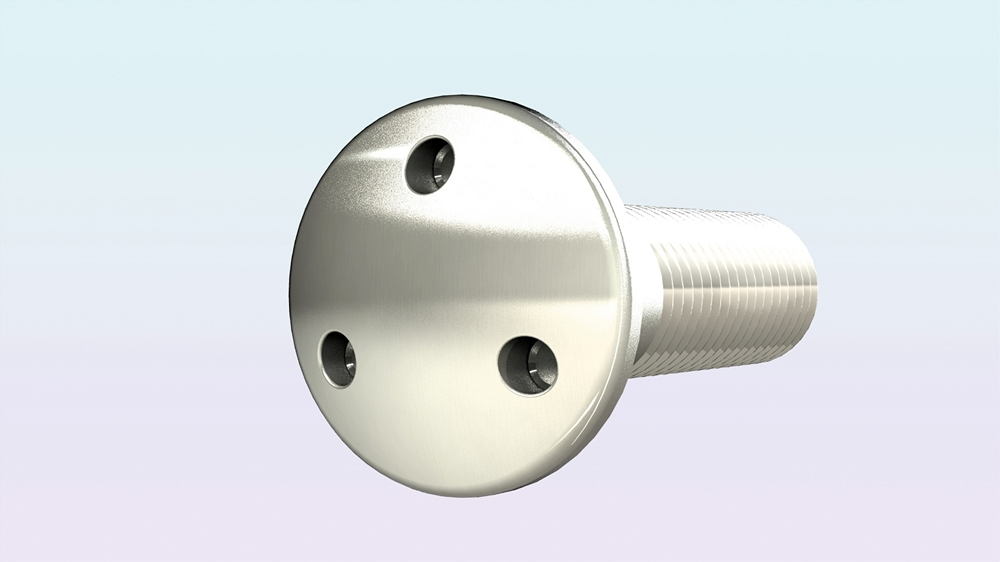
Spanner screw with 3 holes

The knife manufacturer Microtech uses a variation of this with 3 round holes arranged in a triangle shape. The camera company Leica Camera has used versions of this on rewind knobs and other levers on their rangefinder cameras.

=== 12-spline flange ===
The 12-spline flange screw drive has twelve splines in the fastener and tool. It consists of 12 equally spaced protrusions, each with a 60° angle. It is achieved overlaying 4 equilateral triangles, each one rotated 30° over the previous one. The spline drive was part of the obsolete, U.S-designed Optimum Metric Fastener System and was defined by ASTM B18.2.7.1M, which was withdrawn in 2011, making the spline drive obsolescent.

Spline drives were specified for 5, 6.3, 8, 10, 12, 14, 16, and 20 mm size screws. Its primary advantage is its ability to resist cam-out, so it is used in high-torque applications, such as tamper-proof lug nuts, cylinder head bolts, and other engine bolts.

Care should be taken not to confuse the name of this pattern with the casual phrase "spline head" which usually refers to the XZN pattern.

=== Torx Plus Tamper-Resistant ===
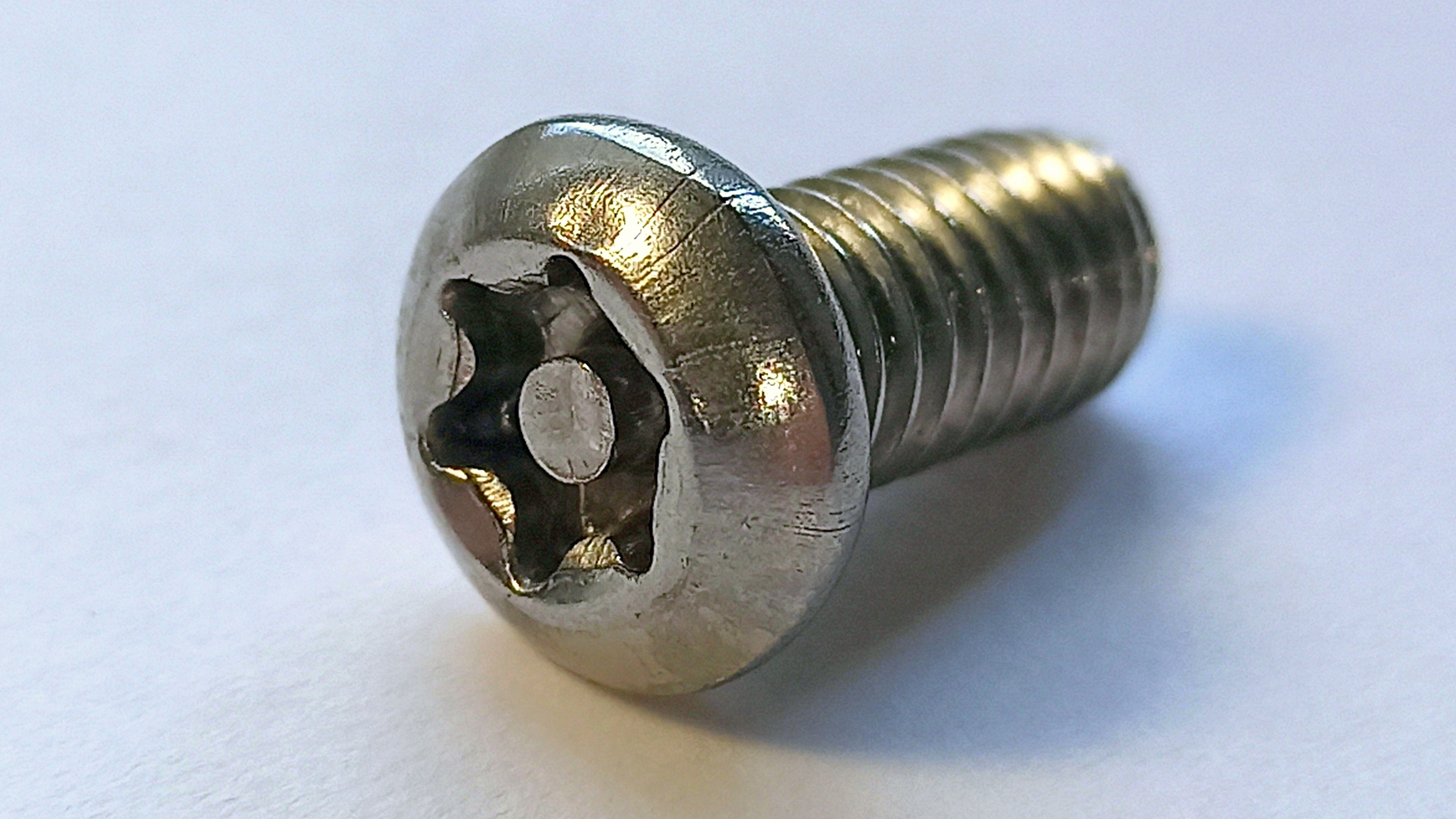
Torx Tamper-Resistant

The tamper-resistant variant of Torx Plus, sometimes called Torx Plus Security, has a center post. It is used for security as the drivers are uncommon.

=== Tri-angle ===
The TA is a type of screw drive that uses a triangle-shaped recess in the screw head. This drive can restrict access to the device internals but can readily be driven with hex keys. These screws are often found in children's toys from fast food restaurants, as well as vacuum cleaners, fan heaters, elevators, camping stoves, golf clubs, electric kettles and Master Locks, among others. Sizes include TA14, TA18, TA20, TA23 and TA27. The bits are sized by 10 times the height (in mm) measurement of the equilateral triangle. An important attribute of a correctly manufactured bit is that it must have smooth blunted corners because there is no relief in the screw. The blunted corners make it impossible to directly measure the bit size with a caliper. The size, or height, can easily be inferred by measuring the size of the inscribed circle. Either an expensive V-anvil micrometer (smaller than typically found in a machine shop) or an inexpensive precision 60° "V" found in the common thread center gauge work well. The later requires some measurement setup, but uses more common shop tools. Once the inscribed diameter is known the height is 1.5 times the diameter. As with all tool/fastener measurements there should be some clearance. Generally, the size is 'nominally perfect', meaning, in this case, the inscribed circle will be slightly smaller than the size infers, perhaps 0.1mm to 0.05mm. It is common to often find the size marked on the tool is wrong and differs between manufactures. Interestingly, some bit kits are strangely built, having sizing too big, too small, and just right. The saving grace being that there are many small incrementally sized bits in most kits, and one of them will 'work'.

Note that the sides of the triangle are straight, which differs from Tri-point-3 fasteners.

=== Tri-point ===
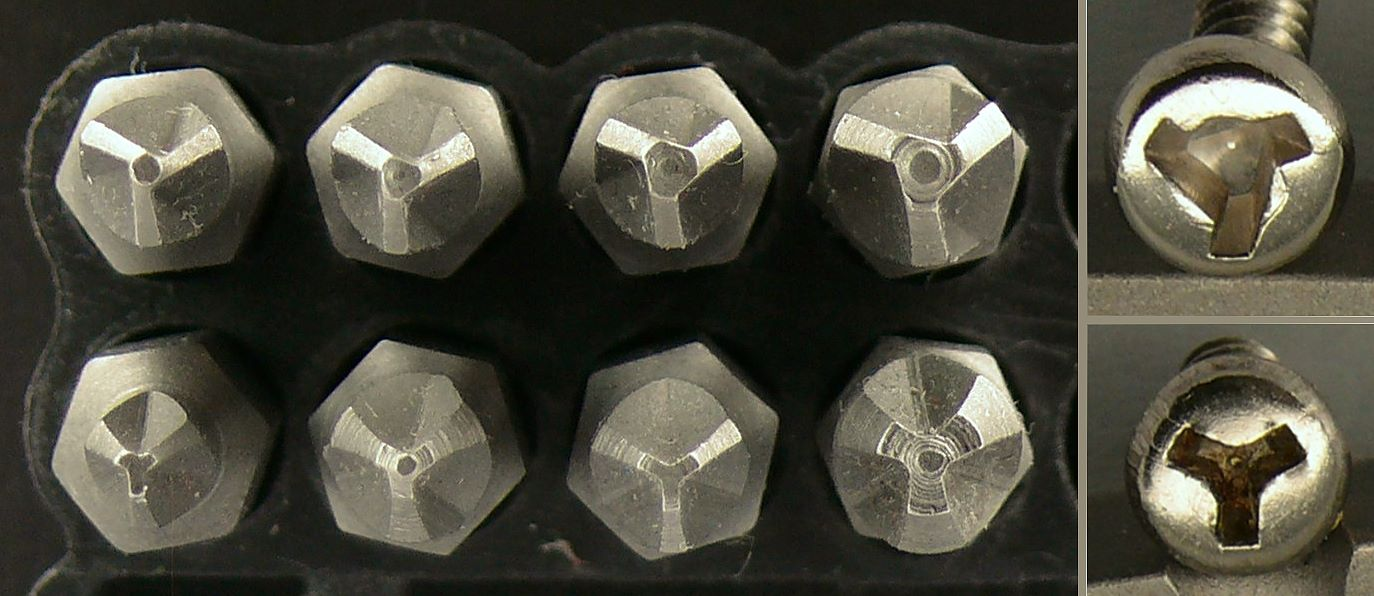
First row: Tri-Wing bits and screw head. Beneath: Tri-Point/Y-Type.

The TP (or Y-type) security screw drive is similar to the Phillips screw head, but with three points rather than four. These specialized screws are usually used on electronics equipment, including some Nintendo handheld hardware, Sanyo and Kyocera cellular telephones, and Fuji digital cameras. Apple uses Y-type screws to secure the battery on the 2010 and 2011 MacBook Pro, as well as an extremely small type in the Apple Watch, iPhone 7 and iPhone X. This style of screw is often called a "tri-wing", although that name more properly belongs to a different design (see below).

=== Tri-point-3 ===
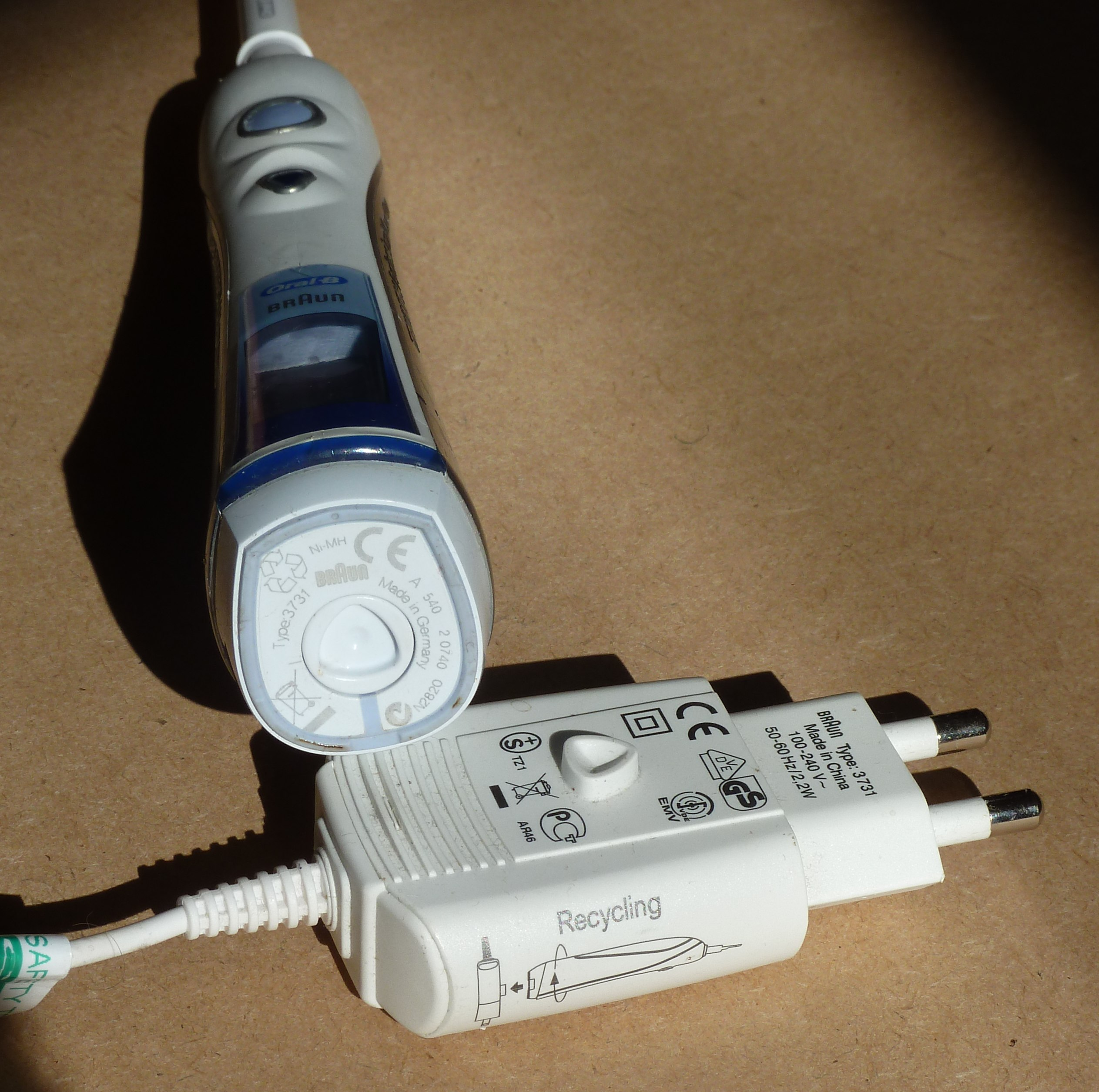
Oral-B rechargeable toothbrush, showing the TP3 headed screw used to hold the case together. When the rechargeable battery is no longer serviceable, the toothbrush case may be opened by removing this screw, allowing access to the battery and motor units for recycling. The wall adapter has a molded screwdriver on its case to facilitate this.

TP3 (sometimes referred to as tri-lobe or tri-lobular) uses a Reuleaux triangle-shaped recess in the screw head, to make it semi-secure because it cannot be driven by a flat-blade screwdriver and is not readily driven, as Tri-angle is, by hex keys. It is used on fast food promotional toys and video games, die-cast toys, and some Roomba battery packs. There are four sizes: A = 2 mm, 2.3 mm, 2.7 mm, and 3.2 mm.

=== Tri-groove ===
Tri-groove or T-groove is a design for a security screw with a flat-topped conical head and three short radial slots that do not join in the center.

=== Tri-wing ===
The tri-wing, also known as triangular slotted, is a screw with three slotted "wings" and a small triangular hole in the center. Unlike the "tri-point" fastener, the slots are offset, and do not intersect the center of the fastener. A version with left-hand threads is called an Opsit screw, where unscrewing can be done by turning the screwdriver clockwise, which is the opposite of tri-wing and regular screws.

The design was adopted by some parts of the aerospace industry, led by Lockheed in the early 1970s on the L-1011, but met with mixed results due to complaints of insert damage during installation. McDonnell Douglas also used this as a primary fastener on its commercial aircraft. British Aerospace Bombardier and Airbus are also users of this fastener.

== Other types ==
A U-drive screw, also known as a hammer drive screw, has a domed head with no means of turning it. The shank has a helical thread with an angle acute enough to be driven by a hammer or pressure from an arbor press. These screws are most frequently driven into plastics with a pre-drilled pilot hole.

== See also ==
- Mechanical joint
- Screw
- Screwdriver bit
- Wrench
