= Spring plunger =

Spring-loaded device for indexing, locating, positioning

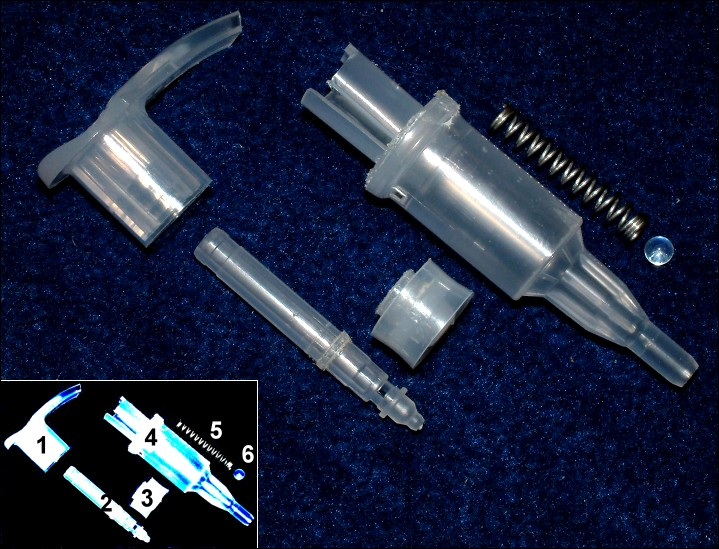
Spring-loaded ball in a disassembled soap dispenser (5 and 6, top right)

A spring plunger or detent spring is a spring-loaded mechanical part to ease indexing, positioning, securing, and disassembling of objects without losing parts. The spring force keeps the pin in position during normal use.

Typically, it is a machine part consisting of a hollow cylinder with an internal compression spring acting on a pin. The pin may, for example, be shaped as a rod with either a cylindrical or rounded tip (broadly categorized as a spring plunger), or a spring-loaded ball (ball plunger) if the spring acts against a ball.

== Manufacture ==
Spring plungers can be supplied as a complete unit that is mounted into the workpiece by screwing into threads, or in a pluggable version that is pressed into the workpiece. The sleeve is usually made of free machining steel.

Alternatively, it can be made directly into the workpiece by drilling and tapping a hole, then inserting a pin (or ball), spring, and finally a set screw.

The spring force is tuned for the intended use. In spring plungers with a screw, the spring pressure can be adjustable within a certain working range.

Different plungers may require different tools for installation, such as a hex key, socket wrench, or flathead screwdriver. Blind hole mounting variants may have tool slots on the same side as the pin.

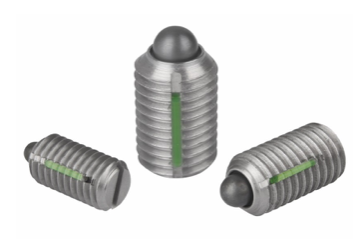
Spring plunger, cylindrical pin with rounded tip

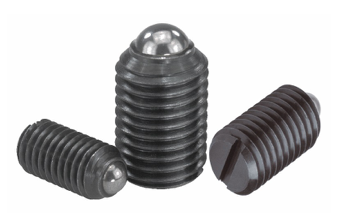
Ball plunger

== Materials ==
At high temperatures or when the parts are exposed to aggressive chemicals, plastic balls or balls made of corrosion-resistant materials such as silicon nitride can be used. The threaded sleeve is then typically made of stainless steel instead of carbon steel.

== Use ==
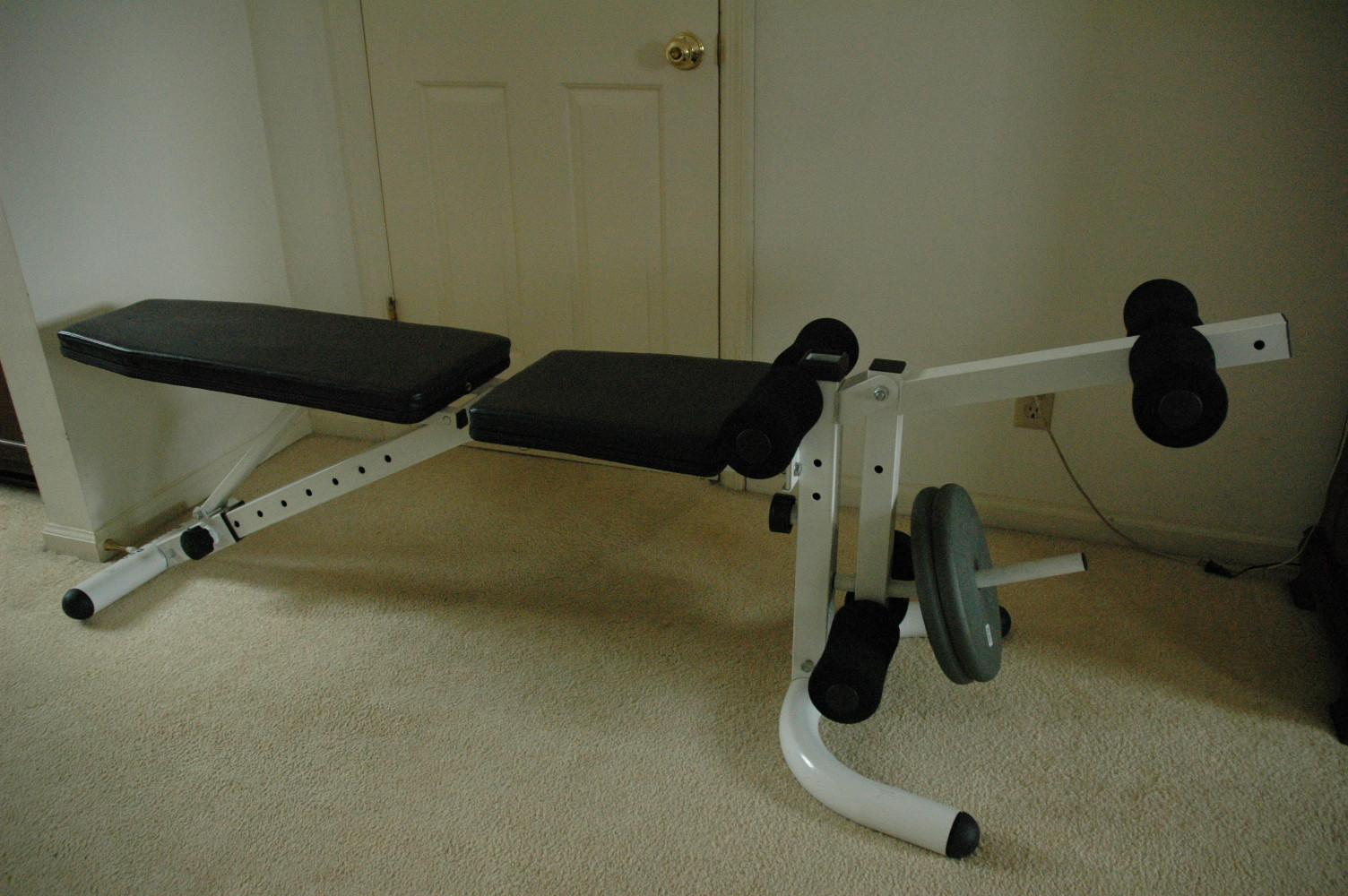
Utility bench with spring-loaded control lever that can be set to different notches to adjust the angle

Spring-loaded plungers have a wide range of uses.

Some spring plungers are designed to be handled only when assembling or occasionally adjusting equipment. Other spring plungers are designed to be routinely manipulated (for example, to adjust the angle of a utility bench), and may have an integrated operating lever that is pushed in (push pin plungers) or a lever that is pulled out to manipulate the object (pull pin plunger).

Similar principles are used in spring-loaded valves and valve stems (including safety valves), or automatic ejectors on firearms.

=== Mechanics ===
Spring plungers can be used, for example, to lock levers in different positions. Spring-loaded plungers with anti-twist protection enable screwless fastening.

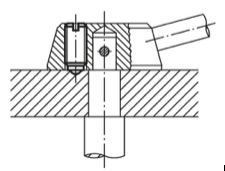
Spring plungers used to lock a lever

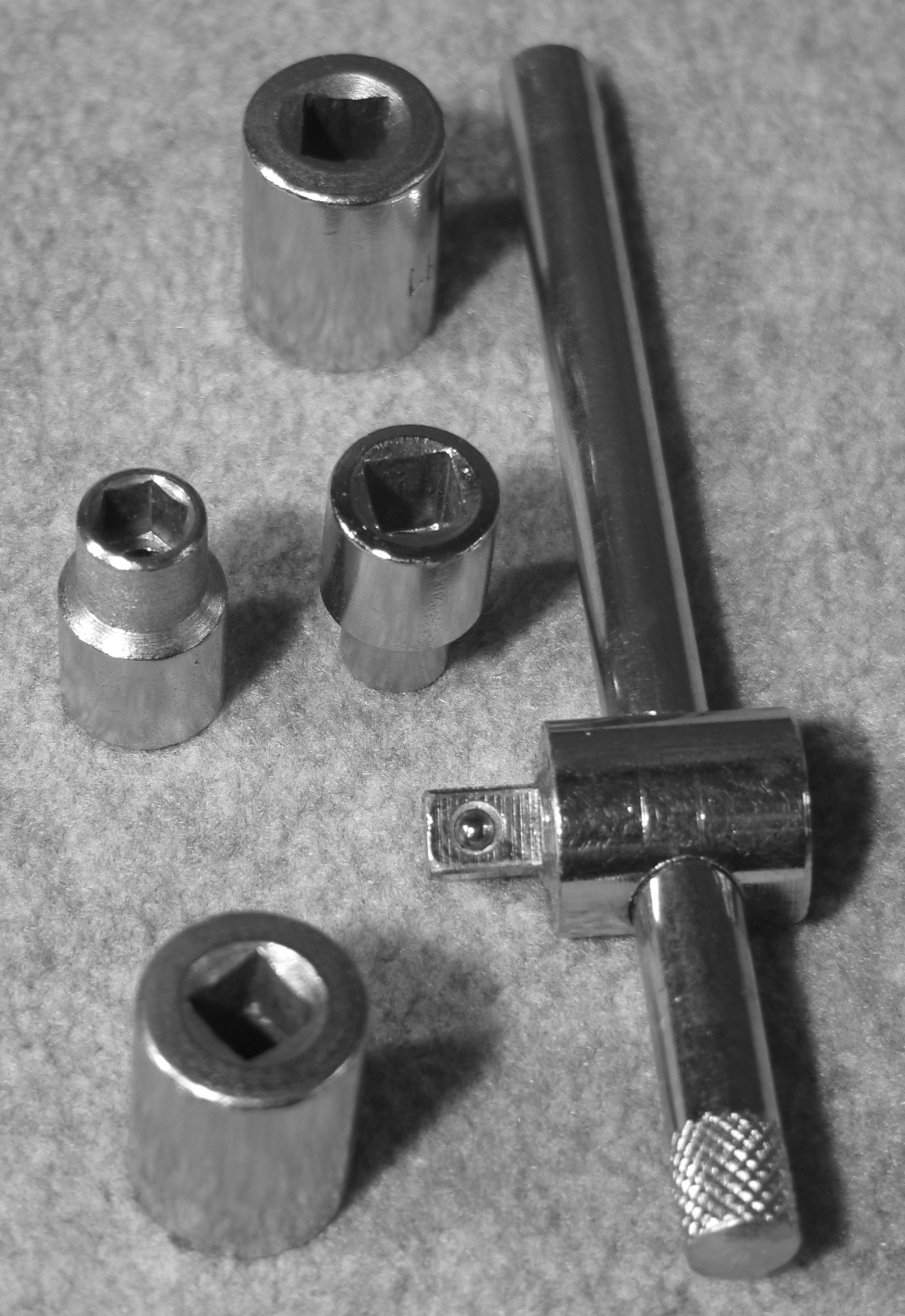
Square socket wrench with a spring-loaded ball plunger to hold the socket

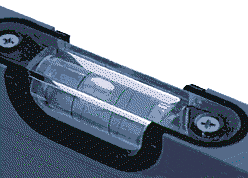
Mechanical levels can often be adjusted with spring-loaded set screws.

=== Electronics ===
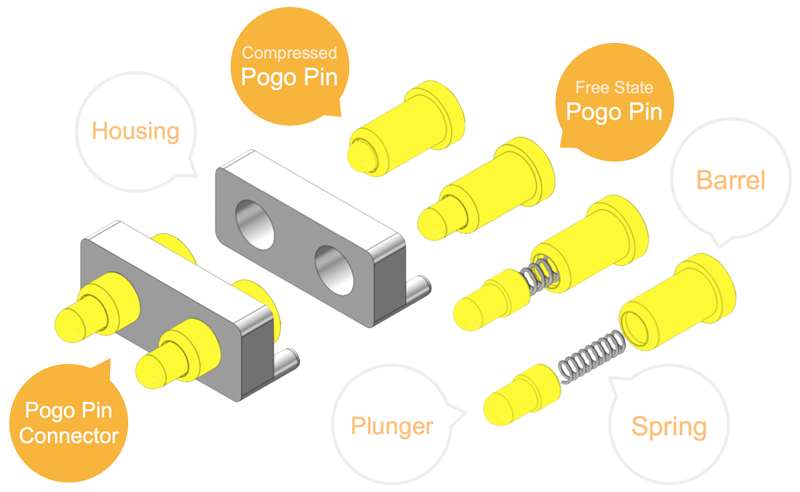
Diagram of components in typical pogo pins used to connect electronic equipment

A pogo pin is a type of electrical connector mechanism widely used in modern electronics. Compared to other electrical connectors, they have better durability and are more resistant to mechanical shock and vibration.

=== Archery ===
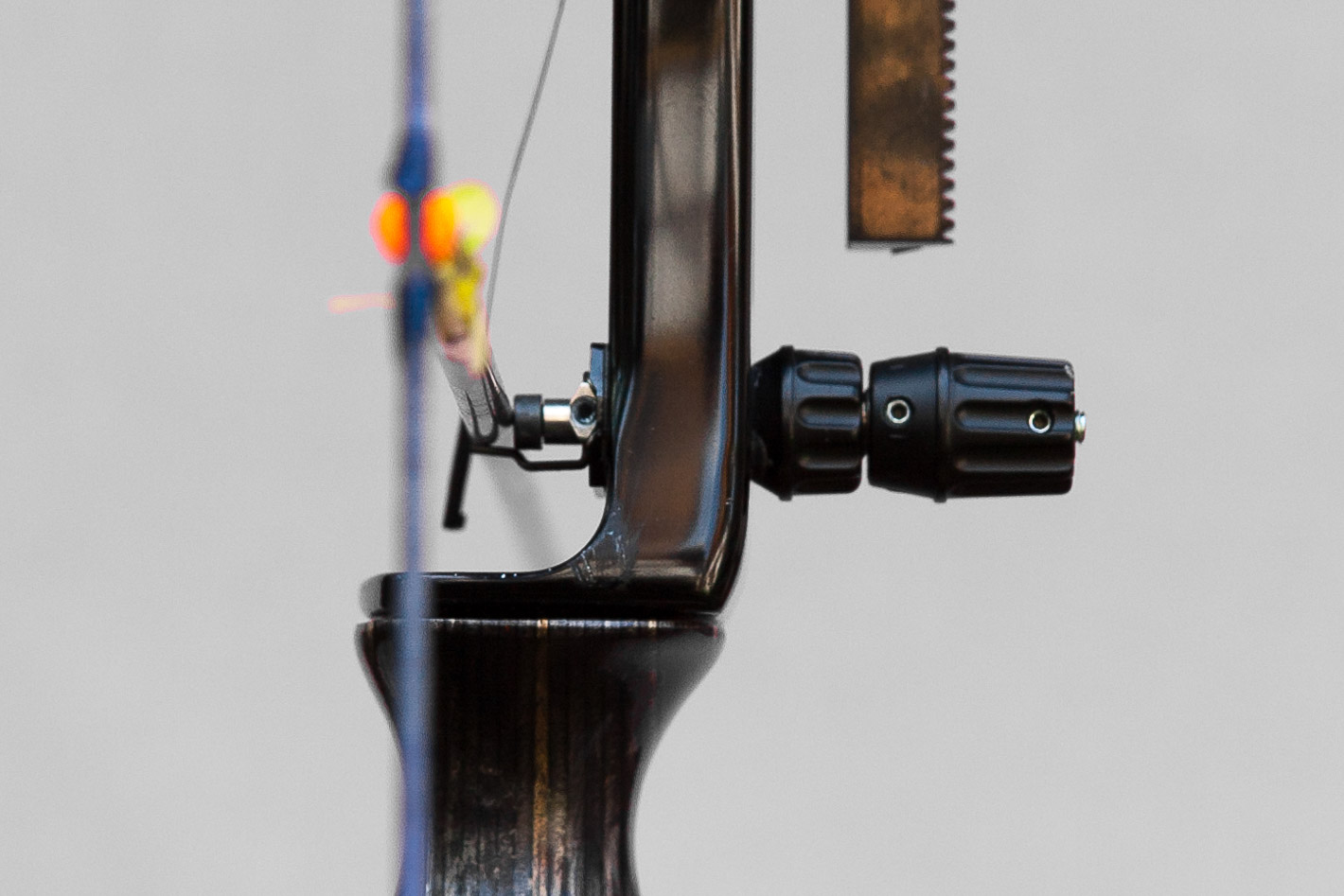
Plunger with adjustment knob on a recurve bow

In modern archery, an archery plunger allows the arrow to be deflected as it is fired from the bow. It allows for adjusting the arrow's relative position on the arrow rest. By adjusting the stiffness and position of the plunger, the arrow can be adjusted to fly with the best possible flight, so that it travels straight.

== See also ==
- Spring pin, mechanical fastener that secures the position of two or more parts relative to each other
- Detent
- Ball detent
