= List of screw and bolt types =

This is a list of types of threaded fasteners, including both screws and bolts.

== Fasteners with a tapered shank ==
American name	British name	Description
chipboard screw particle board screw		Similar to a drywall screw, except that it has a thinner shank and provides better resistance to pull-out in particle board, while offset against a lower shear strength. The threads on particle board screws are asymmetrical.
concrete screw Tapcons masonry screw Confast screw multi-material screw blue screw self-tapping masonry screw Titen		A stainless or carbon steel screw for fastening wood, metal, or other materials to concrete or masonry. Concrete screws are commonly blue in color, with or without corrosion coating. They may either have a Phillips flat head or a slotted hex washer head. Nominal (thread) sizes range from 0.1875 to 0.375 in (4.763 to 9.525 mm) and lengths from 1.25 to 5 in (32 to 127 mm). Typically an installer uses a hammer drill to make a pilot hole for each concrete screw and a powered impact driver to drive the screw. The drill hole should be 1/2" longer than the depth penetration of the screw. The screw itself should be drilled a minimum of 1" into the concrete to hold effectively and a maximum of 1-3/4" or the threads will wear and will lose holding power. Ideally 1-1/4" to 1-1/2" of screw thread in the concrete. So for example, if a 1/2" board is being screwed onto the concrete, a 1-3/4" to 2" concrete screw should be used.
deck screw		Similar to drywall screw, except that it has improved corrosion resistance and is generally supplied in a larger gauge. Most deck screws have a type-17 (auger type) thread-cutting tip for installation into decking materials. They have bugle heads that allows the screw to depress the wood surface without breaking it.
double-ended screw dowel screw hanger bolt	handrail bolt	Similar to a wood screw but with two pointed ends and no head, used for making hidden joints between two pieces of wood. A hanger bolt has wood screw threads on one end and machine threads on the other. A hanger bolt is used when it is necessary to fasten a metal part to a wood surface.
drive screw hammer drive screw		Chiefly used for attaching manufacturers data plates to equipment. Smooth round or mushroom headed with a multi-start thread on the shank, beneath which is reduced diameter shank that acts as a pilot. The screw is fastened by hitting the head with a hammer and is not intended for removal.
drywall screw		Specialized screw with a bugle head that is designed to attach drywall to wood or metal studs, but it is a versatile construction fastener with many uses. The diameter of drywall screw threads is larger than the grip diameter.
eye screw screw eye vine eye loopheaded screw	screw eye	Screw with a looped head. Larger ones are sometimes called lag eye screws. Designed to be used as attachment point, particularly for something that is hung from it. A vine eye (in the UK at least) is similar to a screw eye, except that it has a proportionally longer shank and smaller looped head. As the term suggests vine eyes are often used for attaching wire lines across the surface of buildings so that climbing plants can attach themselves.
lag bolt lag screw	coach screw	Similar to a wood screw, except that it is generally much larger running to lengths up to 15 in (381 mm) with diameters from 0.25–0.5 in (6.35–12.70 mm) in commonly available (hardware store) sizes (not counting larger mining and civil engineering lags and lag bolts) and it generally has a hexagonal drive head. Lag bolts are designed for securely fastening heavy timbers (post-and-beam, timber railway trestle bridges) to one another, or to fasten wood to masonry or concrete. The German standard is DIN 571, Hexagon head wood screws. Lag bolts are usually used with an expanding insert called a lag in masonry or concrete walls, the lag manufactured with a hard metal jacket that bites into the sides of the drilled hole, and the inner metal in the lag being a softer alloy of lead, or zinc alloyed with soft iron. The coarse thread of a lag bolt and lag mesh deform slightly, making a secure, near watertight, anti-corroding, mechanically strong fastening.
mirror screw		This is a flat-head wood screw with a tapped hole in the head, which receives a screw-in chrome-plated cover. It is usually used to mount a mirror.
sheet metal screw		Has sharp threads that cut into a material such as sheet metal, plastic or wood. They are sometimes notched at the tip to aid in chip removal during thread cutting. The shank is usually threaded up to the head. Sheet metal screws make excellent fasteners for attaching metal hardware to wood because the fully threaded shank provides good retention in wood.
Twinfast screw		A Twinfast screw is a type of screw with two threads (i.e. a twin-start screw), so that it can be driven twice as fast as a normal (i.e. single-start) screw with the same pitch. Drywall screws designated as fine are the most common screws to use the twinfast style of threads.
wood screw		A metal screw with a sharp point designed to attach two pieces of wood together. Wood screws are commonly available with flat, pan, or oval-heads. A wood screw generally has a partially unthreaded shank below the head. The unthreaded portion of the shank is designed to slide through the top board (closest to the screw head) so that it can be pulled tight to the board to which it is being attached. Inch-sized wood screws in the U.S. are defined by ANSI-B18.6.1-1981(R2003), while in Germany they are defined by DIN 95 (Slotted raised countersunk (oval) head wood screws), DIN 96 (Slotted round head wood screws), and DIN 97 (Slotted countersunk (flat) head wood screws).
Security head screw		These screws are used for security purposes and where vandalism and/or theft is likely. The head of this type of screw is impossible to reverse. It requires special tools or mechanisms like spanners, tri-wings, torxes, square drivers, etc. In some screws, the head can be removed by breaking it after installing the screw.

== Fasteners with a non-tapered shank ==
	American name	British name	Description
	anchor bolt		A special type of bolt that is set into concrete, with screw threads protruding above the concrete surface to accept a nut.
	breakaway bolt		A breakaway bolt is a bolt with a hollow threaded shank, which is designed to break away upon impact. Typically used to fasten fire hydrants, so they will break away when hit by a car. Also used in aircraft to reduce weight.
	cap screw		The term cap screw refers to many different things at different times and places. Currently, it most narrowly refers to a style of head (see the gallery below). More broadly, and more commonly, it refers to the group of screws: shoulder screws, hex heads, counter-sunk heads, button heads, and fillister heads. In the United States, cap screws are defined by ASME B18.6.2 and ASME B18.3. In the past, the term cap screw, in general, referred to screws that were supposed to be used in applications where a nut was not used; however, the characteristics that differentiate it from a bolt vary over time. In 1910, Anthony defined it as screw with a hex head that was thicker than a bolt head, but the distance across the flats was less than a bolt's. In 1913, Woolley and Meredith defined them like Anthony, but gave the following dimensions: hex head cap screws up to and including 7/16 inch (11.1125 mm) have a head that is 3/16 inch (4.7625 mm) larger than the shank diameter; screws greater than 1/2 inch (12.7 mm) in diameter have a head that is 1/4 inch (6.35 mm) larger than the shank. Square head cap screws up to and including 3/4 inch (19.05 mm) have a head 1/8 inch (3.175 mm) larger than the shank; screws larger than 3/4 inch (19.05 mm) have a head 1/4 inch (6.35 mm) larger than the shank. In 1919, Dyke defined them as screws that are threaded all the way to the head.
	socket screw		A socket cap screw, also known as a socket head capscrew, socket screw, or Allen bolt, is a type of cap screw with a cylindrical head and hexagonal drive hole. The term socket head capscrew typically refers to a type of threaded fastener whose head diameter is nominally 1.5 times that of the screw shank (major) diameter, with a head height equal to the shank diameter (1960 series design). Forged heat-treated alloy examples are high strength fasteners intended for the most demanding mechanical applications, with special alloy formulations available that are capable of maintaining strength at temperatures in excess of 1000 degrees F (587 degrees C). In addition to the 1960 series design, other head designs include low head, button head and flat head, the latter designed to be seated into countersunk holes. A hex key (sometimes referred to as an Allen wrench, Allen key, or hex driver) is required to tighten or loosen a socket screw. Socket head capscrews are commonly used in assemblies that do not provide sufficient clearance for a conventional wrench or socket.
	carriage bolt	cup head bolt, coach bolt	A carriage bolt, also known as a coach bolt, has a domed or countersunk head, with a shank topped by a short square section under the head. Unlike "regular" bolts, a carriage bolt has a smooth head that does not accept tools; instead, counter-rotation is provided by the square section of shank. Carriage bolts are used where the appearance of the finished part is important, for example on carriage exteriors: the bolt is inserted from the outside of the part, with only the smooth head visible; the square section of the shank aligns with a square hole in the part, which provides counter-rotation as the nut is tightened without needing to engage the bolt head. A rib neck carriage bolt has several longitudinal ribs instead of the square section, to grip into a metal part being fixed.
	confirmat screw	confirmat screw	Used in particleboard and medium-density fiberboard
	elevator bolt		An elevator bolt is a similar to a carriage bolt, except the head (or foot, depending on the application) is thin and flat. There are many variations. Elevator bolts are designed to be used for leveling appliances or furniture.
	eye bolt		An eye bolt is a bolt with a looped head. They are used to firmly attach a securing eye to a structure, so that ropes or cables may then be tied to it.
	hex cap screw hex bolt		A hex cap screw is a cap screw with a hexagonal head, designed to be driven by a wrench (spanner). An ASME B18.2.1 compliant cap screw has somewhat tighter tolerances than a hex bolt for the head height and the shank length. The nature of the tolerance difference allows an ASME B18.2.1 hex cap screw to always fit where a hex bolt is installed but a hex bolt could be slightly too large to be used where a hex cap screw is designed in.
	Fine adjustment screw		The term fine adjustment screw typically refers to screws with threads from 40–100 TPI (Threads Per Inch) (0.5 mm to 0.2 mm pitch) and ultra fine adjustment screw has been used to refer to 100–254 TPI (0.2 mm to 0.1 mm pitch). These screws are most frequently used in applications where the screw is used to control fine motion of an object.
	machine screw		A machine screw is generally a smaller fastener (less than 1/4 inch (6.35 mm) in diameter) threaded the entire length of its shank that usually has a recessed drive type (slotted, Phillips, etc.). Machine screws are also made with socket heads (see above), in which case they may be referred to as socket head machine screws.
	stove bolt	gutter bolt	A Stove bolt is a type of machine screw that has a round or flat head and is threaded to the head. They are usually made of low grade steel, have a slot or Phillips drive, and are used to join sheet metal parts using a hex or square nut.
	plow bolt	plough bolt	A plow bolt is bolt similar to a carriage bolt, except the head is flat or concave, and the underside of the head is a cone designed to fit in a countersunk recess. Plow bolts provide a smooth surface for attaching a plow moldboard to its beam, where a raised head would suffer from soil abrasion. There are many variations, with some not using a square base, but rather a key, a locking slot, or other means. The recess in the mating part must be designed to accept the particular plow bolt. ASME B18.9 standard recommends a No. 3 head (round countersunk head square neck) plow bolts and No. 7 head (round countersunk reverse key head) plow bolts for new designs. The necessary dimensions for the head styles can be found in the standard.
	self-drilling screw Tek screw		Similar to a sheet metal screw, but it has a drill-shaped point to cut through the substrate to eliminate the need for drilling a pilot hole. Designed for use in soft steel or other metals. The points are numbered from 1 through 5; the larger the number, the thicker metal it can go through without a pilot hole. A 5-point can drill through 0.5 in (12.7 mm) of steel, for example.
	self-tapping machine screw		A self-tapping machine screw is similar to a machine screw, except the lower part of the shank is designed to cut threads as the screw is driven into an untapped hole. The advantage of this screw type over a self-drilling screw is that, if the screw is reinstalled, new threads are not cut as the screw is driven.
	set bolt	tap bolt, setscrew	A bolt that is threaded all the way to the head. An ASME B18.2.1 compliant set/tap bolt has the same tolerances as an ASME B18.2.1 compliant hex cap screw.
	set screw	grub screw	A set screw is generally a headless screw but can be any screw used to fix a rotating part to a shaft, such as a line shaft or countershaft. The set screw is driven through a threaded hole in the rotating part until it is tight against the shaft. The most often used type is the socket set screw, which is tightened or loosened with a hex key.
	shoulder bolt shoulder screw	stripper bolt	A shoulder screw differs from machine screws in that the shank is held to a precise diameter, known as the shoulder, and the threaded portion is smaller in diameter than the shoulder. Shoulder screw specifications call out the shoulder diameter, shoulder length, and threaded diameter; the threaded length is fixed, based on the threaded diameter, and usually quite short. Shoulder screws can be manufactured in many materials such as alloy heat-treated steel for maximum strength and wear resistance and stainless steel for its corrosion-resistance and non-magnetic properties. Common applications for shoulder screws include joints in rotating mechanisms, linkage pivots, and guides for the stripper plate of a metal-forming die set. In the latter application, the term stripper bolt is often substituted. Stainless steel shoulder screws are used with linear motion devices such as bearings, as guides and as pivots in electronic and other critical mechanical applications.
	standoff bolt male-female standoff		A machine screw with a hex head that contains internal threads, usually the same size and pitch as the machine screw itself, so multiple standoffs can be stacked. Common applications include holding stacked circuit boards apart. In some cases (e.g., D-subminiature connectors), short standoffs may be used to receive the jackscrews that lock the connection together.
	tension control bolt		A tension control bolt (TC bolt) is a heavy duty bolt used in steel frame construction. The head is usually domed and is not designed to be driven. The end of the shank has a spline on it which is engaged by a special power wrench which prevents the bolt from turning while the nut is tightened. When the appropriate torque is reached the spline shears off.
	thread rolling screws		These have a lobed (usually triangular) cross-section. They form threads in a pre-existing hole in the mating workpiece by pushing the material outward during installation. In some cases the properly prepared hole in sheetmetal uses an extruded hole. The extrusion forms a lead-in and extra thread length for improved retention. Thread rolling screws are often used where loose chips formed by a thread cutting operation cannot be tolerated.
Sex bolt (front) and binding barrels (rear)	sex bolt, Chicago screw		A fastener comprising a mated pair of screw and post (binding barrel), which are a machine screw and a nut that is barrel-shaped. The nut has a flange and a protruding boss that is internally threaded. The bolt (mated pair, screw and post) sits within the components being fastened, and the flange provides the bearing surface.
