= Confirmat screw =

Type of screw

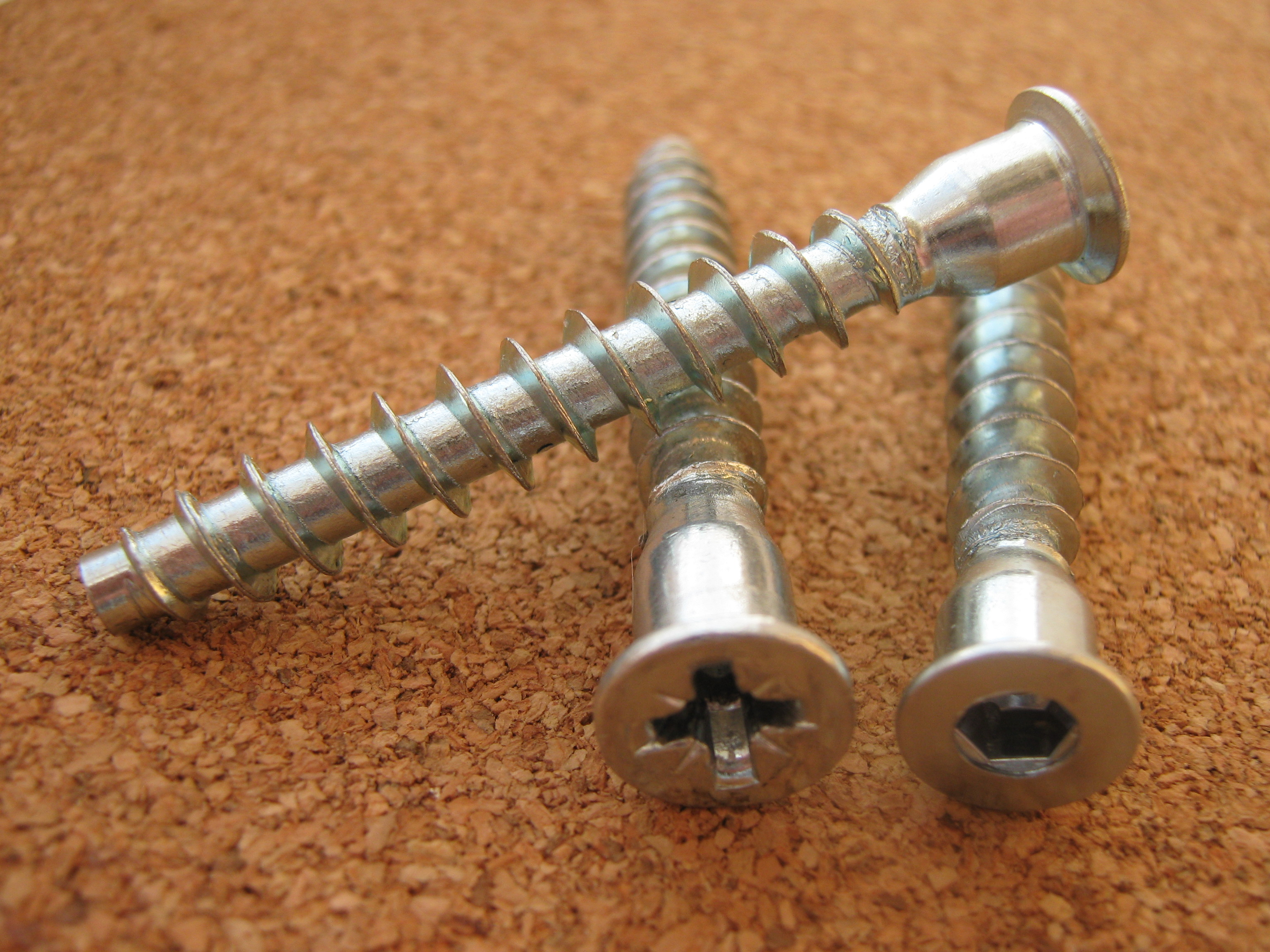
Pozidriv and hex-drive confirmat screws on a sheet of the particleboard material in which they were designed to hold.

Diagram of a hex-headed confirmat screw, made to be turned with an allen key

A confirmat screw holding a butt joint in melamine-coated particleboard.

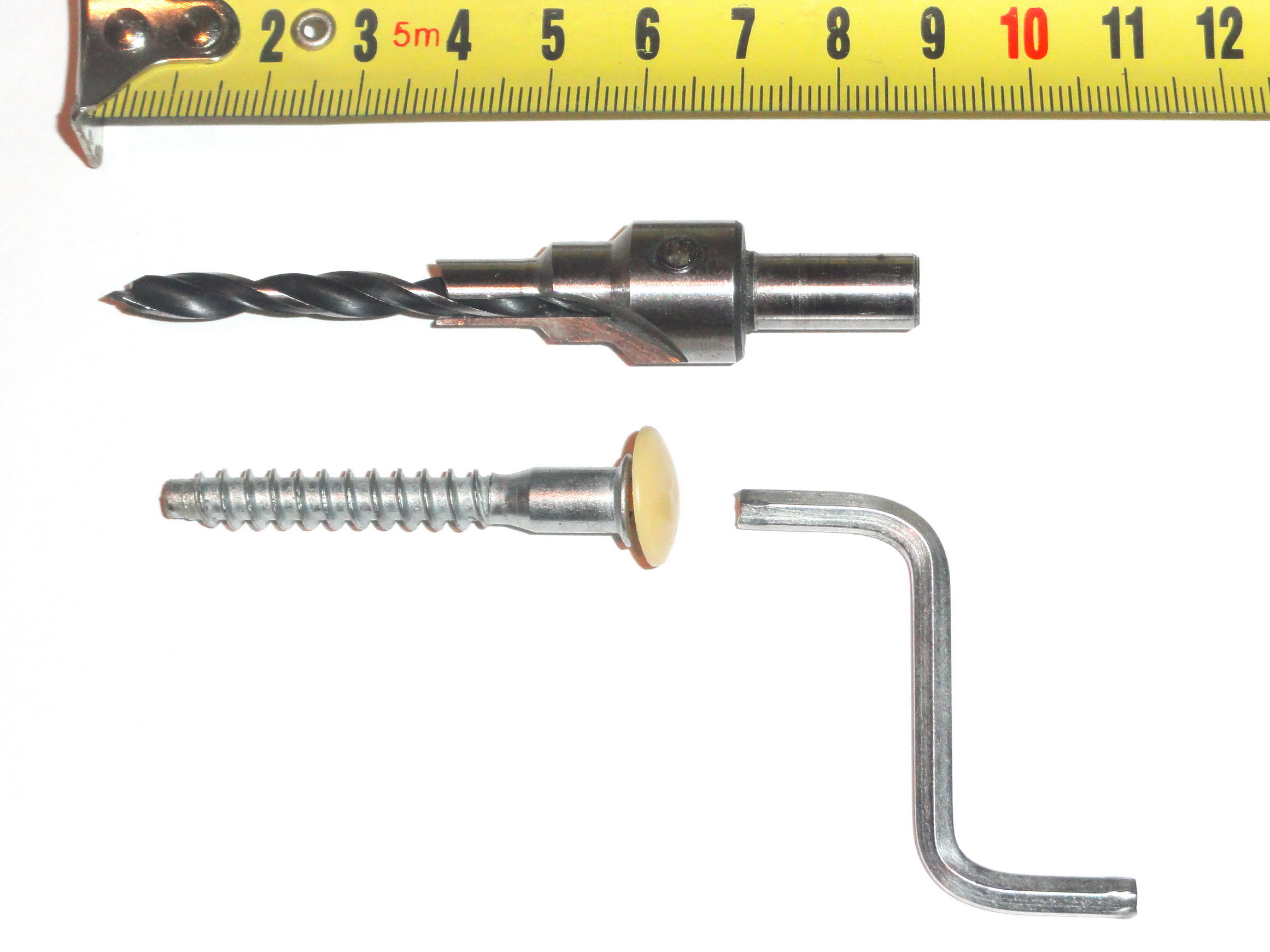
A specialized stepped drill bit and a screw to match it. The screw is covered with a cosmetic plastic cap. The Z-shaped object is an allen key.

Confirmat screws or cabinet-connecting screws are screws designed to hold in particleboard, medium-density fiberboard, and similar materials. They are very common in furniture assembly, but are rare in retail. They may have flat or barrel heads. They have blunt tips, large shanks, and often a shoulder, a broad length of unthreaded shank just below the head, which helps hold the screw in position. They have coarse threads, rather like masonry screws (which may match them exactly in thread).

Confirmat screws are usually screwed into stepped, predrilled holes, often drilled with a stepped bit. Short, shoulderless confirmat screws, whose heads pass through hardware like hinges or drawer slides, may go into unstepped holes.

As they are screwed in, confirmat screws compress a thread (the spiral groove) into the particle board. They do not cut new threads if removed and re-inserted. A confirmat screw can therefore be removed and replaced dozens of times. However, a confirmat screw can not be replaced by a confirmat screw with a different thread, or it will destroy the threading of the hole (filling the hole with a wooden dowel and using a woodscrew can fix a stripped hole).

Confirmats may be made of steel, galvanised steel, and nickel and aluminium-zinc alloys. They commonly come in lengths of 40, 50 and 70 millimetres (1.6, 2.0 and 2.8 in), and in shank sizes of 5, 6.3 and 7 millimetres (0.20, 0.25 and 0.28 in), with Phillips drive or hex heads.

Ordinary wood screws do not hold well in particleboard, which is much weaker than wood. They tend to tear out. Confirmat screws have about twice the shank diameter of woodscrews. Drywall screws, while half the price of confirmat screws, do not hold as well in particleboard-like materials, and cannot be removed and re-inserted. Cam-and-bolt connectors can be swapped out, but are more complex and expensive; confirmat manufacturers say that cams are also weaker than confirmats, if better than drywall screws.

Confirmat screws were formerly under patent, but the patent has expired, and they are now made by many companies.

== Etymology ==
The name comes from the Latin word confirmat, meaning "it makes [something] firm or strong".

== See also ==
- List of screw and bolt types
- Cam fastener
