= Allen (brand) =

Company behind the name "Allen wrenches"

- Current owner: Apex Tool Group
- Country: Hartford, Connecticut, USA
- Introduced: 1910
- Previous owners: Allen Manufacturing Company; Danaher Corporation
- Tagline: "We are the Original!"
- Website: www.allenhex.com

Allen was a brand of hand tools, most widely recognized for its hexagon-shaped wrenches, known generically as "Allen wrenches". As a brand, it was last owned by Apex Tool Group.

== History ==
Allen created the Allen key in 1913 and created the Allen Manufacturing Company Inc advertisement for the Allen Safety Set Screw, a brand of set screw, in the Automobile Trade Directory, January 1913. Originally named Allen Manufacturing Company, the business produced hexagonal set screws and wrenches to fasten them. The terms "Allen wrench" (American English, though "Allen key" is also common in the US) and "Allen key" (British English) are derived from the Allen brand name and refer to the generic product category "hex keys".

W.G. Allen filed the first related patent in 1909 for its recessed hex-driven safety screws, a safety improvement over fasteners which protruded from machinery. While other hex keys were patented before and after this date, the name would persist. Allen left the company shortly after.

An advertisement for Allen safety screws would appear in the 1910 Annual Convention of International Association of Factory Inspectors.

In 1922, Allen Manufacturing Company produced sets of tools under the company name "Bay State", suggesting that they may have privately acquired another hardware manufacturer, namely the Bay State Pump Company.

Apex Tool Group owns the current trademark and has since renewed it.

== End of production ==
In January 2017, Apex Tool Group announced they would end the manufacturing of Allen and Armstrong hand tools in their Sumter, South Carolina manufacturing plant. With this, Apex Communications Director Kelly Rhoads confirmed the line would cease production on March 31. This ended production of the Allen brand in hex keys, L-key, and T-handle styles.

In 2018, Apex began manufacturing official hex keys under their company brand Crescent, referred to as Crescent Apex. The previous Allen website routes to them. They are sold in thirteen piece sets as well as three piece holding tools and no longer use the term "allen wrench" in official branding or marketing.

== Gallery ==
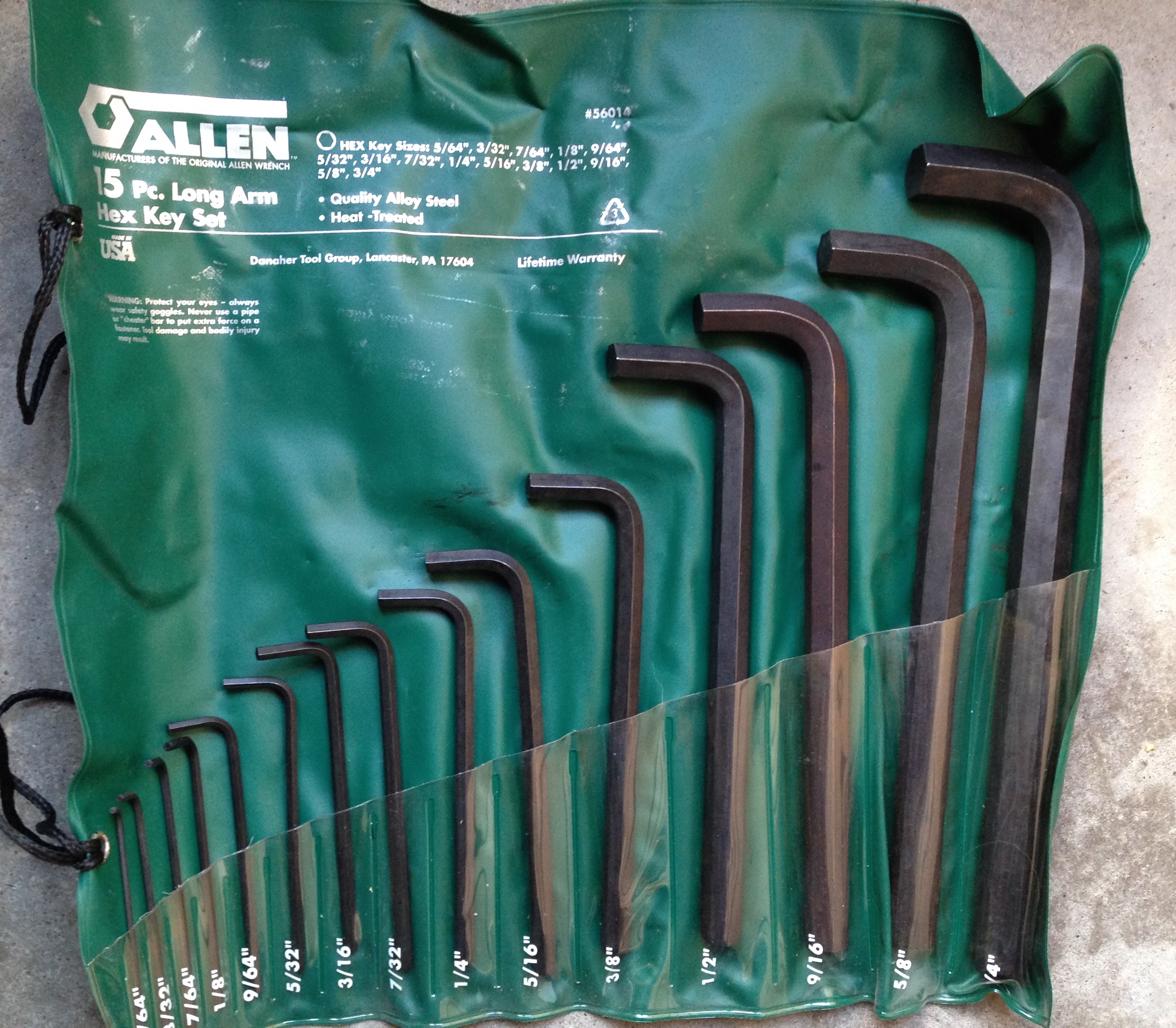
Set of long arm hex keys

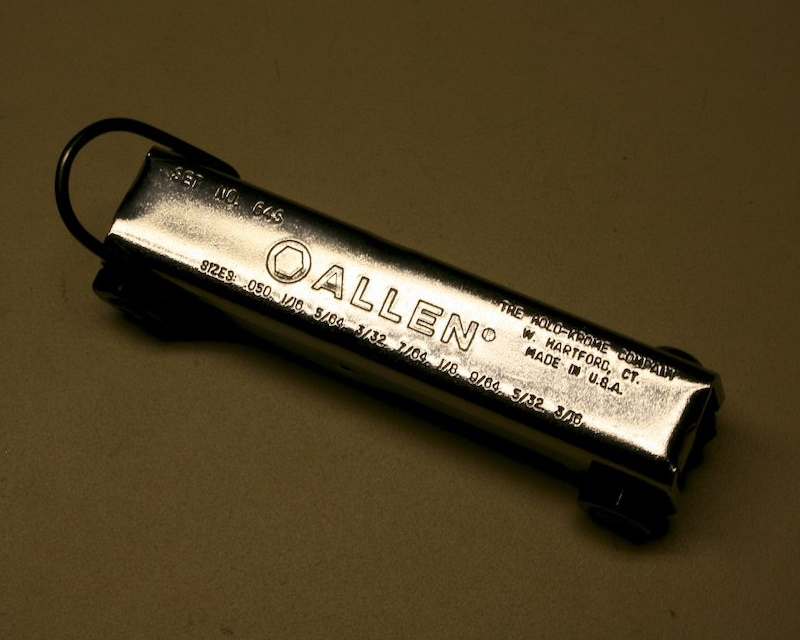
Set of folding hex keys

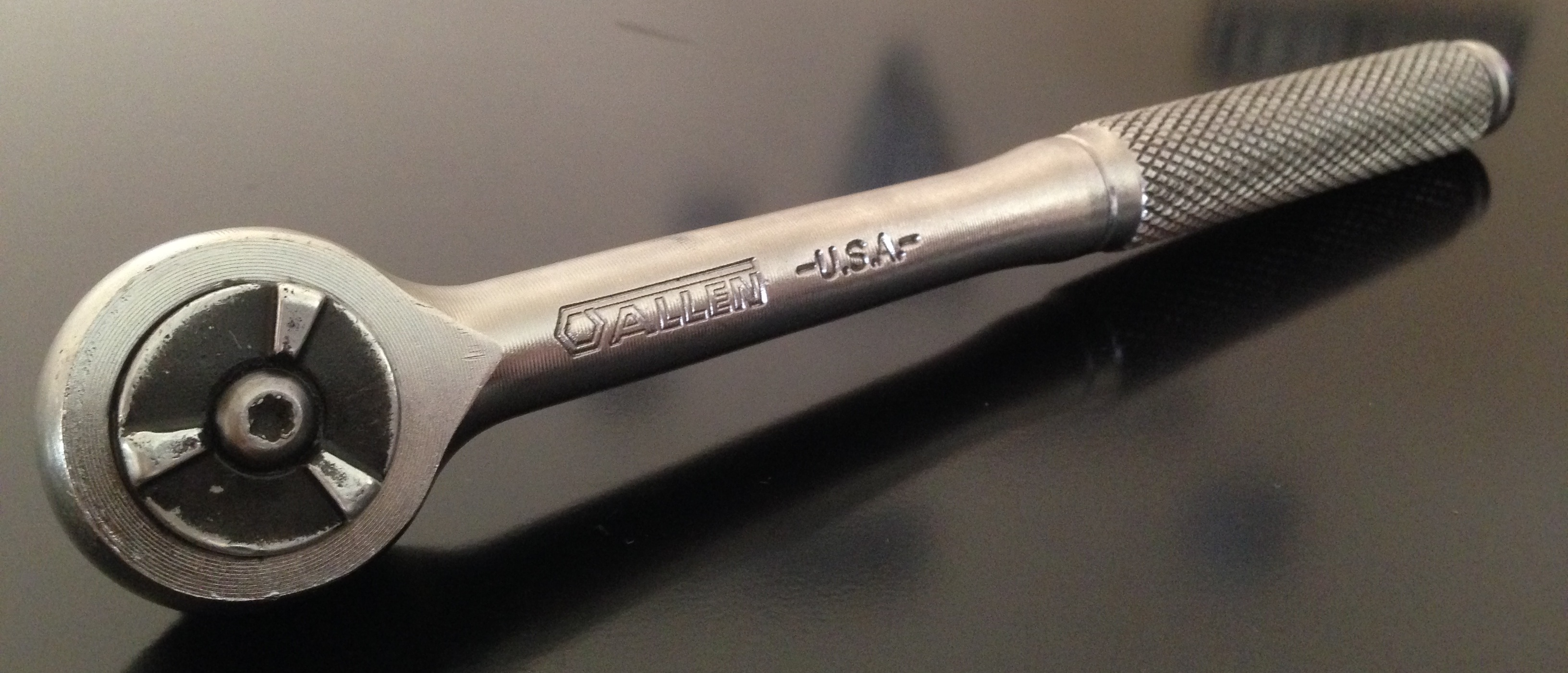
Allen brand ratchet
