= Pentalobular screw thread =

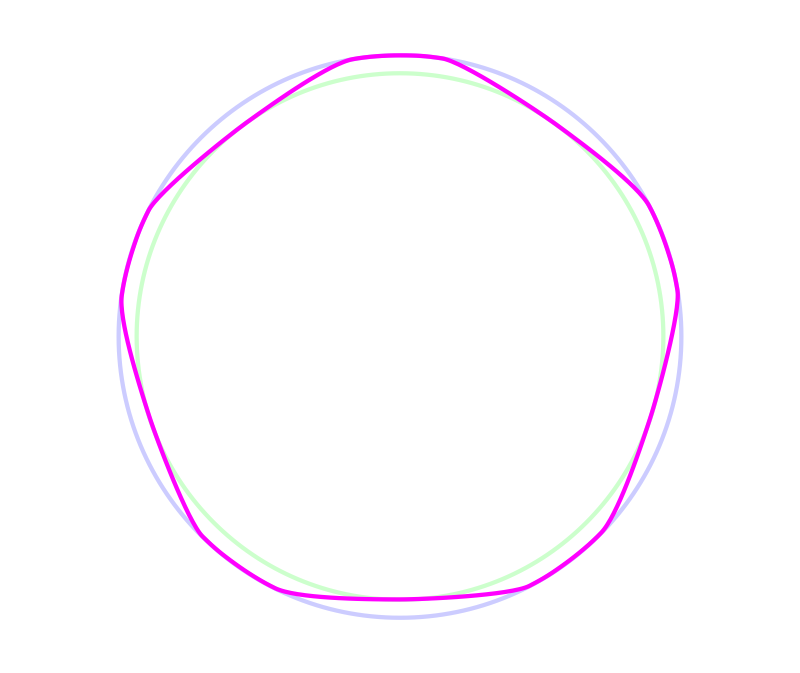
Axial view of a ■ pentalobular thread between the ■ minimum and ■ maximum diameters for the formed thread.The difference in minimum and maximum radii has been exaggerated (doubled) for illustration.

A pentalobular screw thread is a form of self-forming thread used for screws. Self-forming screws are used in ductile materials, such as aluminium and plastics.

Self-tapping screws are widely used for driving into sheet metal or plastics and forming their own thread. They may be either self-drilling, forming their own hole through unbroken material, or fitted into a pre-pierced hole. Self-drilling screws have some ability to cut a thread, as for a tap. Others work not by cutting, but rather by roll-forming the thread, pushing excess material out of the way by plastic deformation. This is one reason why ductile host materials, rather than brittle, are needed.

To form a close-fitting thread that will not be loose afterwards, roll-forming requires a lobed tool rather than a constant diameter cylindrical tool. This is particularly the case when the tool and the fastener are the same, such as for a screw. A lobed or polygonal form allows residual compressive stresses from the forming parts of the thread to be relieved in the undercut clearance between the lobes.

This lobular thread has other advantages too. It allows the screw to be turned with lower torque, which also increases the 'strip-to-drive ratio' between the torques needed to drive the screw in or to damagingly strip the threads out. The proportions of the lobular thread can also change over the length of the screw, so that the tip of the screw can use greater lobulation to form the thread more aggressively and also provide a centring effect.

In conjunction with a thread profile with sharp arrises, a three-lobed thread of this form is the basis of the well-known Taptite screws.

The optimum number of lobes is five. Their number should be prime, to avoid the usual harmonic effects between lobes. As is already widely recognised with tapered reamers, five has better stability than three in imperfectly circular holes. More lobes than this, such as seven, would reduce the spacing for clearance between the lobes. A patent has been applied for about a thread with such an optimised pentalobular form.

Such thread forms are not a new innovation. A patent for machinery to roll-form the threads of the screws was granted in 1975.
