= Utility bench =

Weight training exercise equipment

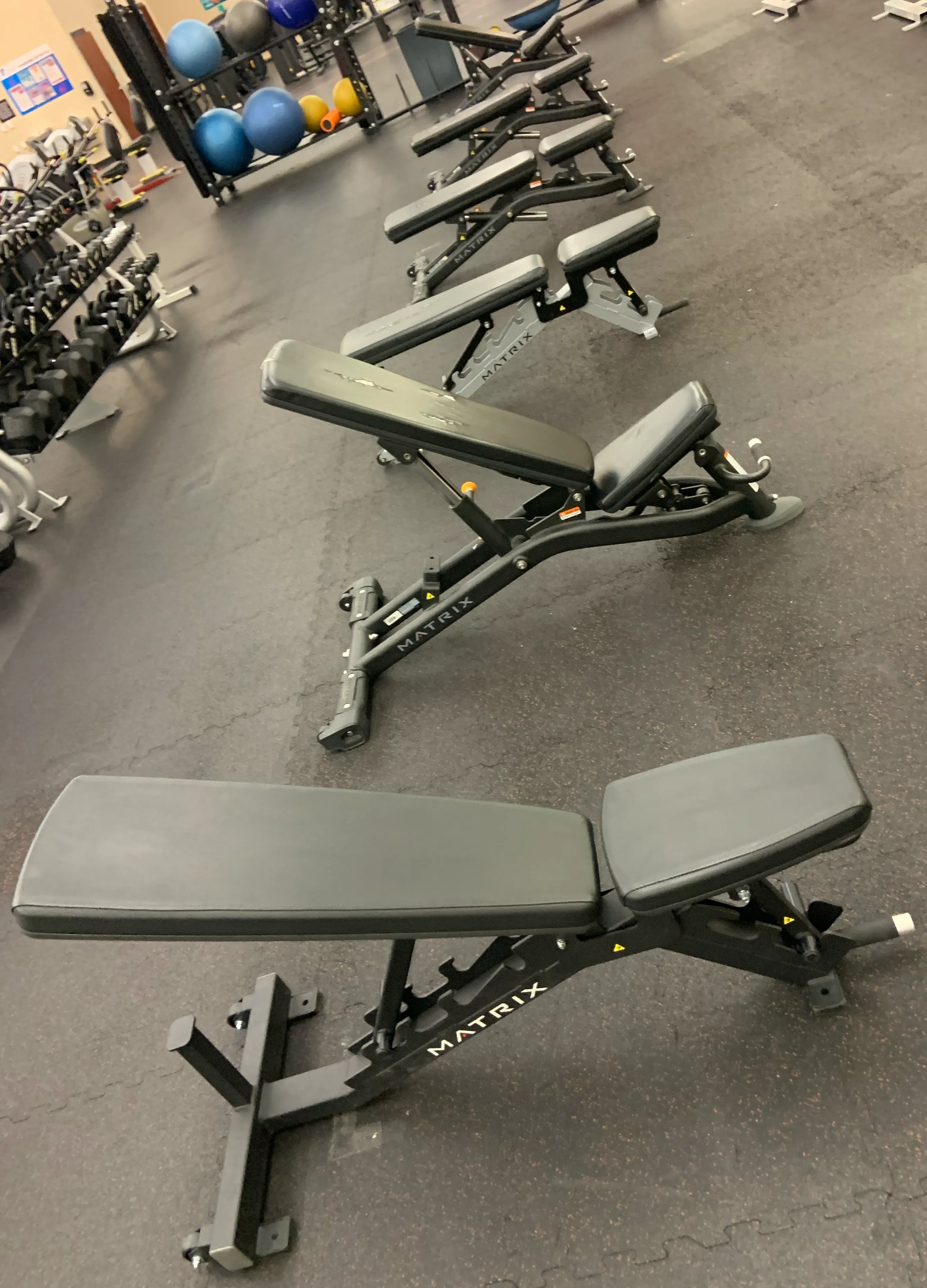
Weight benches at a YMCA

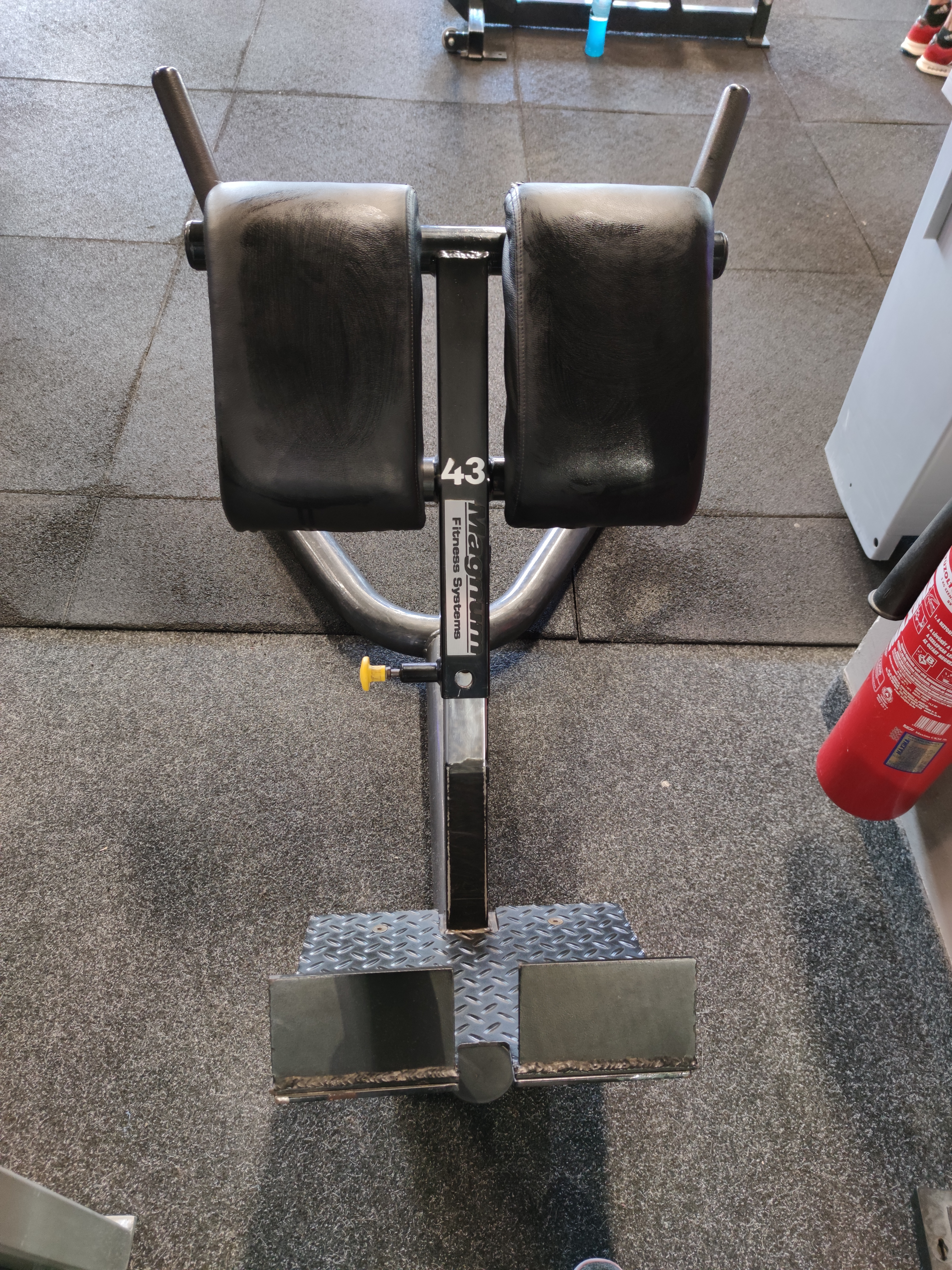
Hyper bench for hyperextension

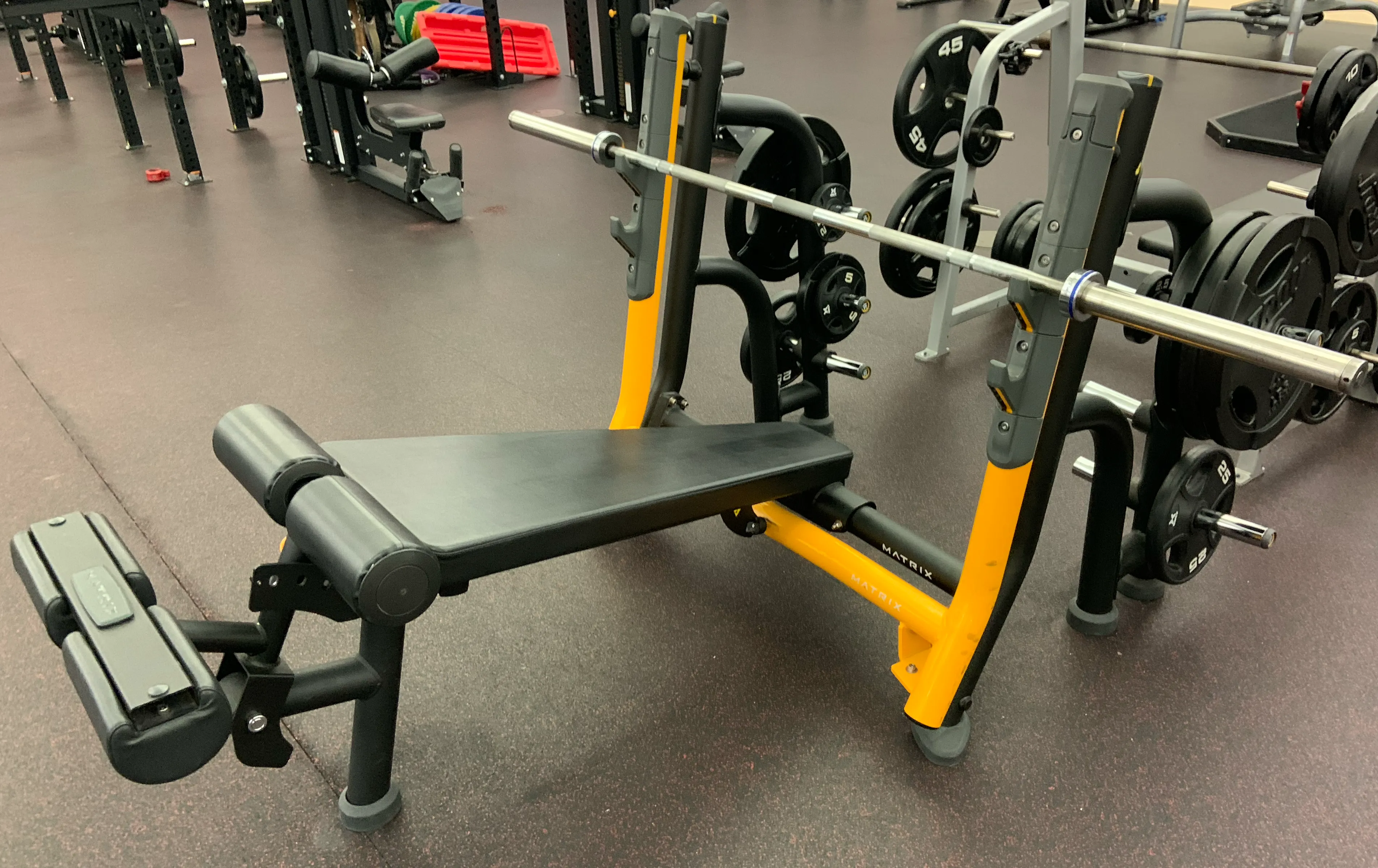
Negative bench or decline bench

A utility bench or weight training bench is a piece of exercise equipment used for improving or facilitating weight training. There are many different designs of utility benches: fixed horizontal, fixed inclined, fixed in a folded position, with one adjustable portion, with two or more adjustable portions, with racks to hold bars, etc.

Utility benches may have associated equipment integrated into the bench for performing specific exercises. Many weight machines have utility benches integrated into them. Utility benches are manufactured by many different vendors, in an array of qualities, features, and prices.

When training with dumbbells, a utility bench is the only accessory equipment required for exercising all of one's muscles, besides the dumbbells themselves.

== Types of utility benches ==
There are six different types of utility benches available.

=== Flat bench ===
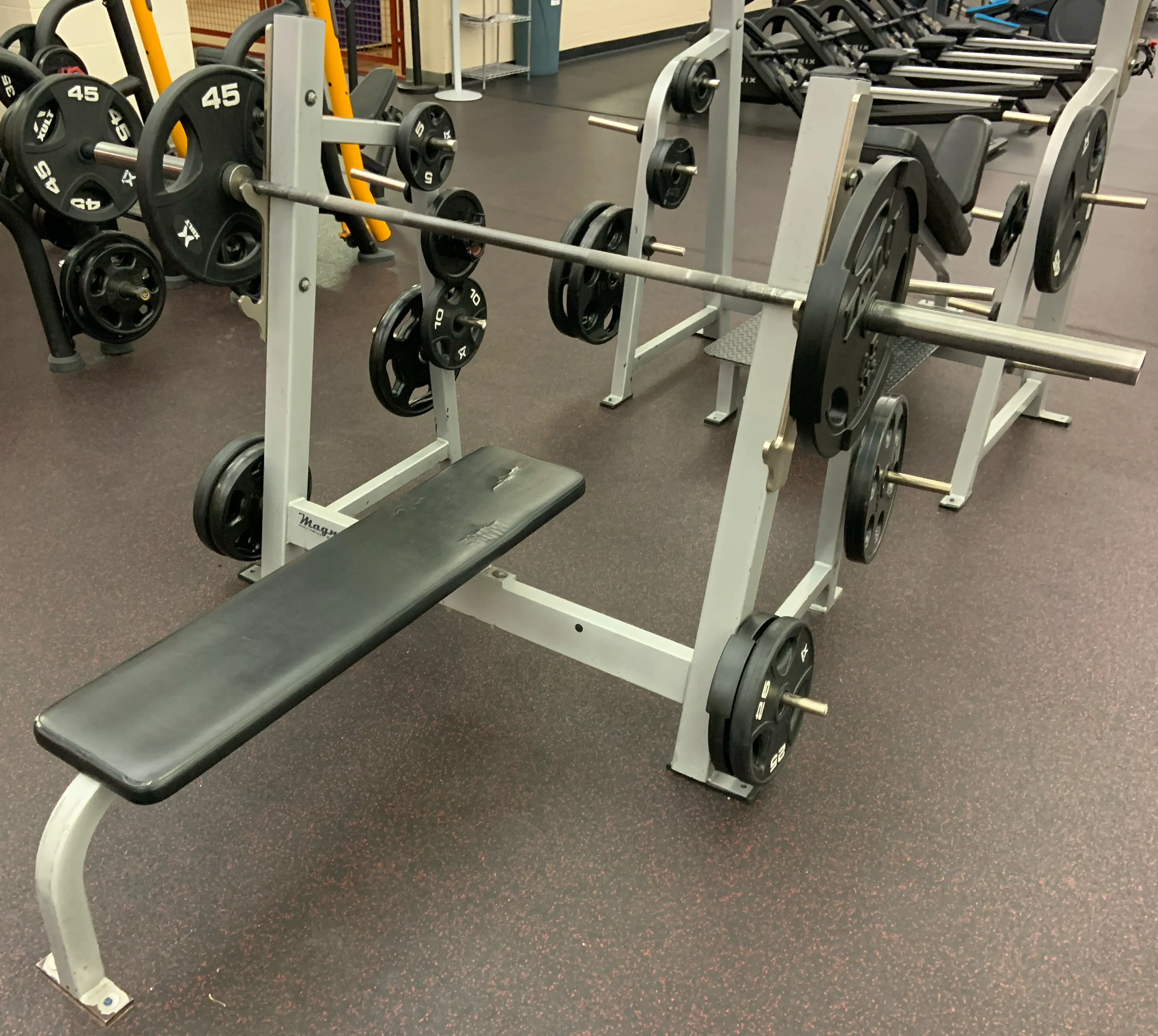
Flat bench press

These are the most common and most popular types of benches. These are the flat benches that do not have any attachments. The main muscle being worked is the chest, and the secondary muscles being used are the triceps and the shoulders.

=== Adjustable utility bench ===
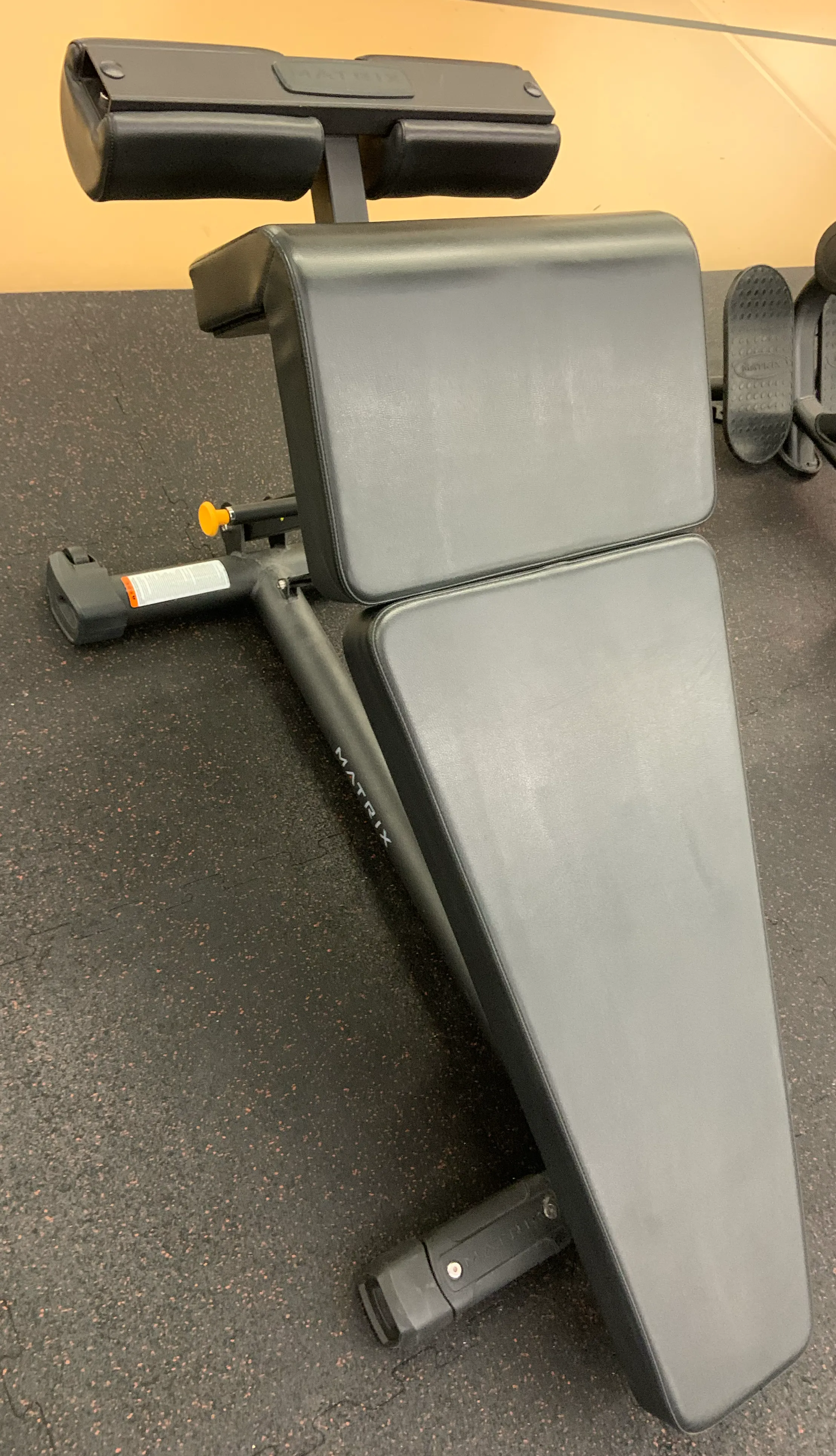
Decline situp bench

An adjustable bench is flexible and allows the user to do many different exercises by adjusting the bench as needed. It can lie flat, can be inclined or declined.

=== Olympic utility bench ===
Olympic benches are professional advance level benches that are wider and longer.

Olympic benches are not simple benches. They have several additional equipment added to them such as squat rack, weight plates, rod, dumbbells, and more. They facilitate advanced exercises such as squats, quad exercises, bench press, and more.

=== Folding utility bench ===
Folding utility benches are more mobile than other types. However, these benches are not feature-rich, since they have to fold, so these are either flat or adjustable benches.

=== Abdominal bench ===
Abdominal benches are designed specifically for performing ab exercises. The position of these benches can be either flat, incline, or decline. These benches have foot rollers that are used to lock the feet, thus protecting the exerciser.

=== Preacher curl bench ===
Preacher curl benches are designed specifically for performing ab preacher curls, which mainly work part of the biceps.

== Alternatives ==
Utility benches facilitate many weight training exercises. However, they are not strictly necessary for many or most of the exercises that typically use them. For example, a bed or table may be suitable for some exercises.

Exercise balls may replace utility benches too in some cases, with the added benefits that they are more space-efficient, offer different uses, and require engagement of the core abdominal muscles. However, it can be difficult to maintain form and balance when lifting more than one's own body weight.

Some exercises may not even need a bench. For instance, seated presses may be done while standing. Before the invention of the utility bench, the common way to work the chest was to lie on the floor and do what was known as the floor or supine press.
