= Self-tapping screw =

Type of screw

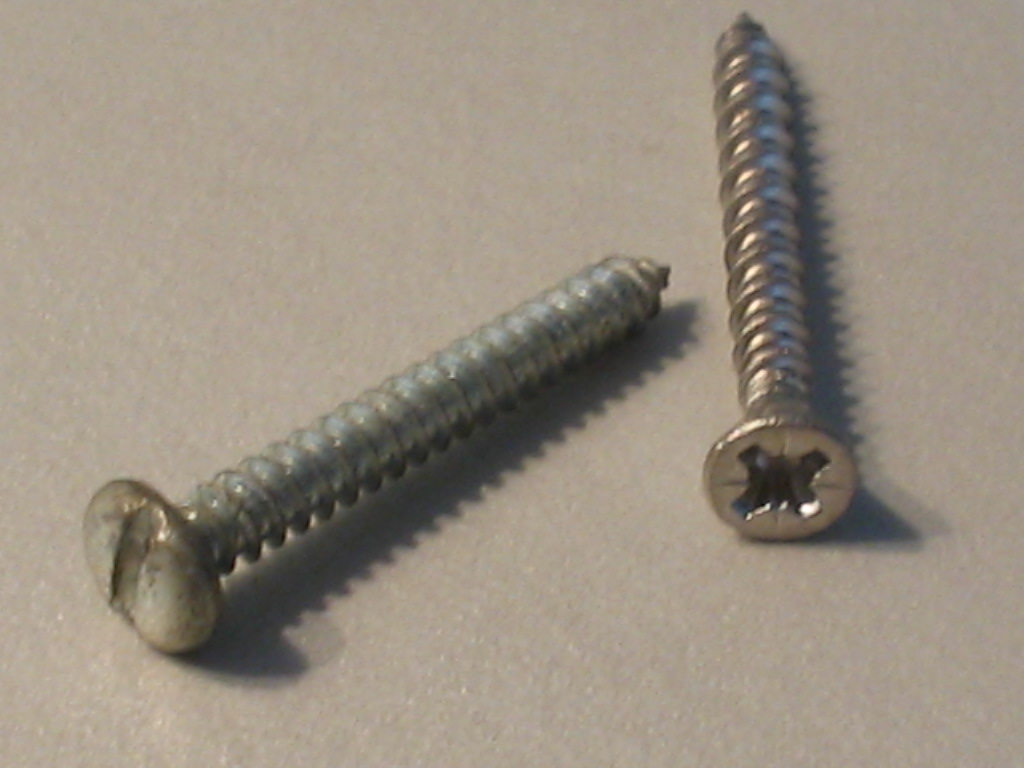
Two thread-forming self-tapping screws with different heads. The countersunk head has a Pozidriv recess.

A self-tapping screw is a screw that can tap its own hole as it is driven into the material. More narrowly, self-tapping is used only to describe a specific type of thread-cutting screw intended to produce a thread in relatively soft material or sheet materials, excluding wood screws. Other specific types of self-tapping screw include self-drilling screws and thread rolling screws.

== Mechanism ==
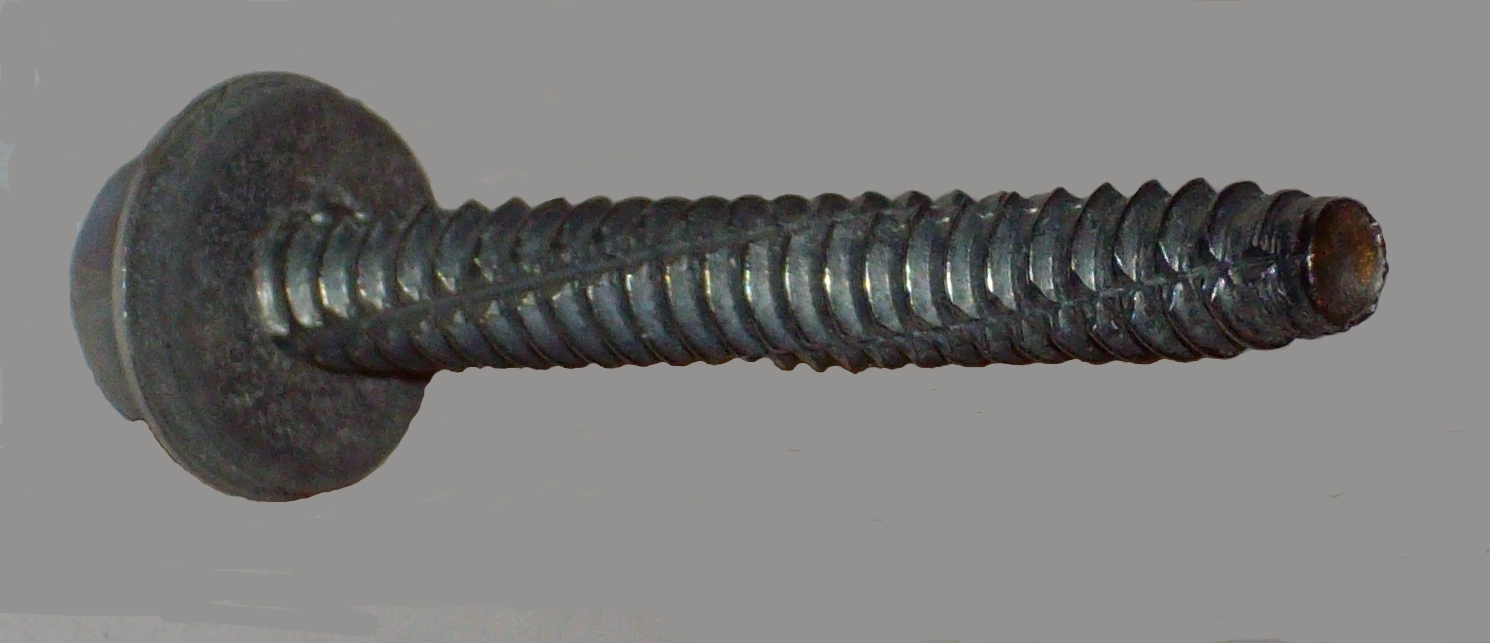
Self-tapping screw with flute and type B (blunt) tip

Self-tapping screws have a wide range of tip and thread patterns, and are available with almost any possible screw head design. Common features are the screw thread covering the whole length of the screw from tip to head and a pronounced thread hard enough for the intended substrate, often case-hardened.

For hard substrates such as metal or hard plastics, the self-tapping ability is often created by cutting a gap in the continuity of the thread on the screw, generating a flute and cutting edge similar to those on a tap. Thus, whereas a regular machine screw cannot tap its own hole in a metal substrate, a self-tapping one can (within reasonable limits of substrate hardness and depth).

For softer substrates such as wood or soft plastics, the self-tapping ability can come simply from a tip that tapers to a gimlet point (in which no flute is needed). Like the tip of a nail or gimlet, such a point forms the hole by displacement of the surrounding material rather than any chip-forming drilling/cutting/evacuating action.

Not all self-tapping screws have a sharp tip. The type B tip is blunt and intended for use with a pilot hole, often in sheet materials. The lack of a sharp tip is helpful for packaging and handling and in some applications may be helpful for reducing the clearance necessary on the reverse of a fastened panel or for making more thread available on a given length screw.

== Thread-forming vs. thread-cutting ==
Self-tapping screws can be divided into two classes: those that displace material (especially plastic and thin metal sheets) without removing it, known as "thread-forming" self-tapping screws, and self-tappers with sharp cutting surfaces that remove the material as they are inserted, termed "thread-cutting" self-tapping screws.

Thread-forming screws may have a non-circular plan view, such as the five-fold symmetry of the pentalobular or the three-fold symmetry of Taptite screws, while thread-cutting screws may have one or more flutes machined into their threads, yielding cutting edges.

== Self-drilling screws ==
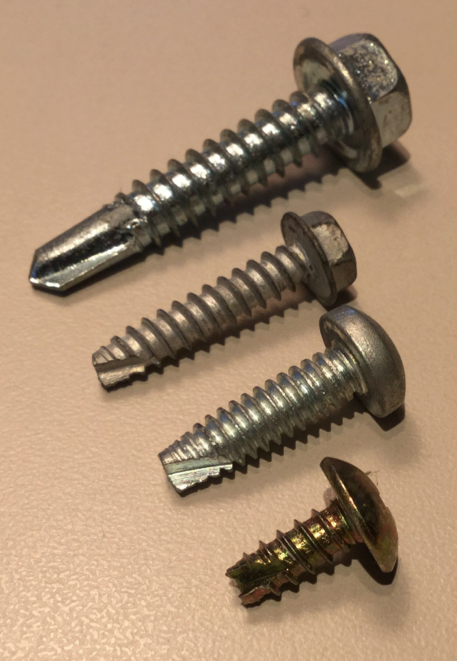
A self-drilling screw and three thread-cutting screws

Some self-tapping screws such as the Tek screw brand, are also self-drilling, which means that in addition to the thread-forming section there is also a fluted tip much like the tip of a center drill. These screws combine hole drilling, threading and fastener installation into one driving motion (instead of separate drilling, tapping, and installing motions); they are thus very efficient in a variety of hard-substrate applications, from assembly lines to roofing. Some types incorporate a sealing washer, for fastening roofing sheets to purlins.

== Sheet metal screw ==
Sheet metal screws (sometimes called "sheet-metal self-tappers", P–K or PK screws from the brand name Parker Kalon, the company which pioneered the manufacture of, but did not invent, these screws) are a type of screw which can form a thread in thin sheet metal. Pan-head self-tapping screws are common in metal cases for electrical equipment, while flatter-headed truss or flat countersunk headed self-tapping screws are found in aviation applications.

== Winged self-tapper ==
Winged self-drilling have thin wings wider than the thread formed just behind the self drilling head. These cut a clearance hole in soft materials (such as wood or plastic), but are destroyed by more robust materials (such as metal). Thus, to clamp some material to metal, the clearance drilling, tap drilling, thread tapping, and fixing itself can happen in a single operation from one side, with the materials in their final position.

== Wood screw ==
Wood screws are technically self-tapping, but are not referred to as such.

== Applications ==
Self-tapping screws are used in a variety of applications ranging from DIY carpentry to surgery.

=== Surgical ===
Dental implants and orthopedic bone screws are both examples of self-tapping screws used in surgery. Different thread profiles are used for either denser cortical bone or the spongy cancellous bone.

== See also ==
- Fasteners with a tapered shank
- Tap
