= Set screw =

Type of screw

Examples of set screws

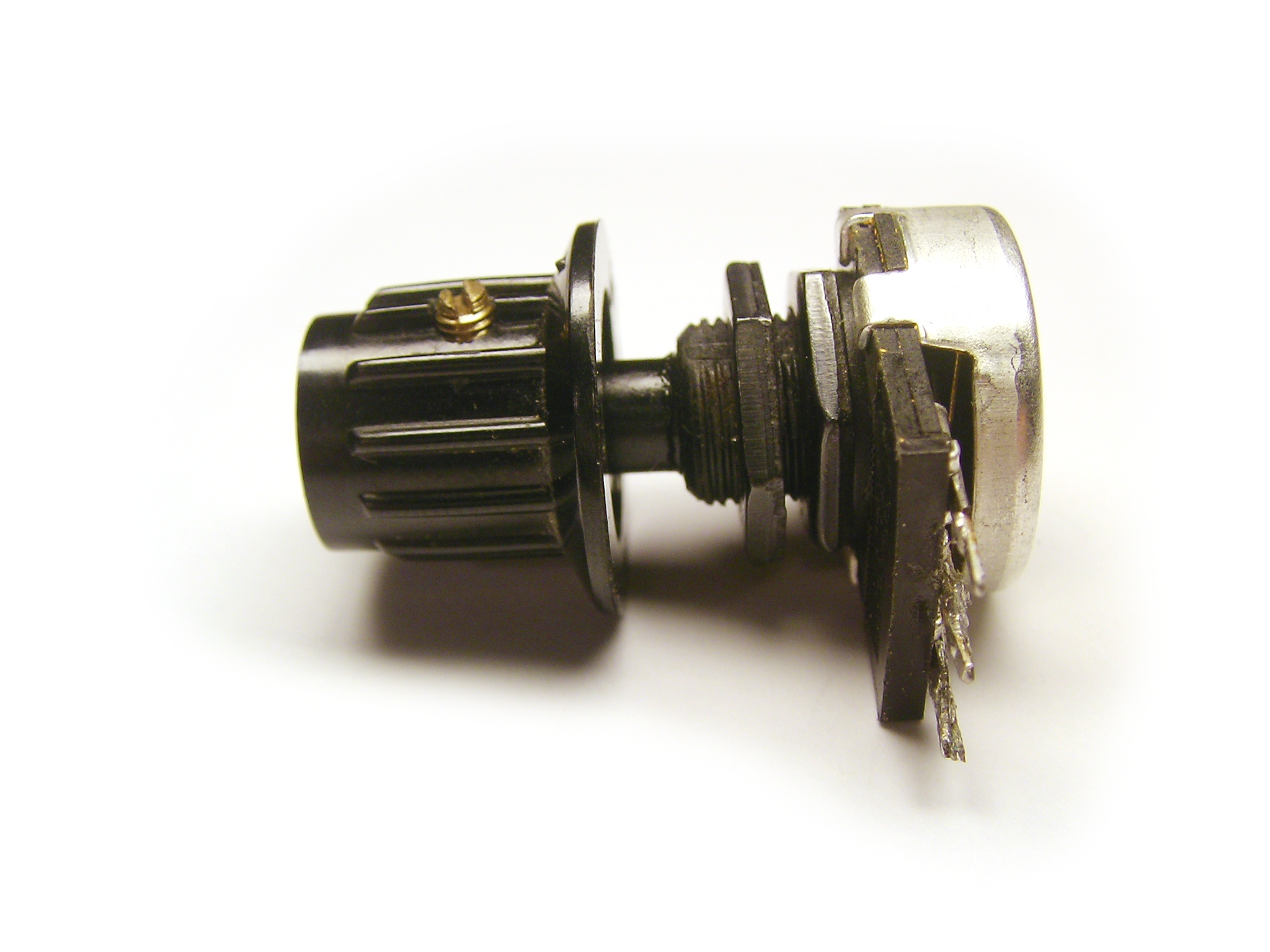
A potentiometer knob with a set screw for locking it in place.

In American English, a set screw is a screw that is used to secure an object, by pressure and/or friction, within or against another object, such as fixing a pulley or gear to a shaft. A set screw is normally used without a nut (which distinguishes it from a bolt), being screwed instead in a threaded hole drilled in only one of the two objects to be secured. A set screw is often headless and threaded along its entire length, so that it will sit entirely inside that hole. In that case it is called a grub screw or blind screw.

Once fully and firmly screwed into the first object, the projecting tip of the set screw presses hard against the second object, acting like a clamp. The second object may have a machined detent (recess) to ensure that it cannot slide under the tip of the screw. On a shaft, this may be simply a flattened area. A set screw may have any type of drive, such as hex or square head, slot, or recessed --- cross (Phillips), hex (Allen), star (Torx), or square (Robertson).

In the UK, the term "set screw" or "setscrew" refers simply to a bolt which is fully threaded, with no smooth shank; called cap screw in the US.

== Torque resistance or transmission ==
Isometric projection of a grub screw with a hex socket head.

Set screws are not always the best way to resist the torque of driven shafts. To reduce the chance of slipping and to increase load capacity, a detent (often called a "flat") may be milled or ground at the part of the shaft where the set screw's point contacts. The detent, however, must be closely aligned with the threaded hole prior to fastening. The operator can often feel the screw push the flat into final alignment as they make the last half- or quarter-turn that tightens the screw. Set screws can successfully hold against heavy-torque applications if the details are right. For example, endmill holders of the solid type typically use large set screws holding against flats to fasten the endmill, and heavy loads are resisted. However, small set screws without flats are prone to spinning and galling if overloaded. The use of keys and keyways instead of, or in combination with, set screws is common for applications requiring high torque resistance or transmission. Splines offer yet more strength.

For longer life, set screws are usually made of alloy steel and case hardened. Hardened set screws often leave a plastic deformation, in the form of a circular or semicircular mark, in the shaft that the screw sets against. This has both pros and cons. On the pro side, such deformation increases the holding power (torque resistance) of the joint, as the screw is essentially "making its own detent" on a small but effective scale. On the con side, if one is aiming to have a blemish-free cosmetic finish on the part being set against, one must take actions to prevent the circular marks. In most set screw applications, this consideration is irrelevant. Another con is that this plastic deformation can cause corresponding high points in the shaft surrounding the circular mark. This can result in difficulties during dis-assembly if a bearing or other tightly toleranced part needs to slide past this area. Use of a flat mitigates this problem.

== Point types ==
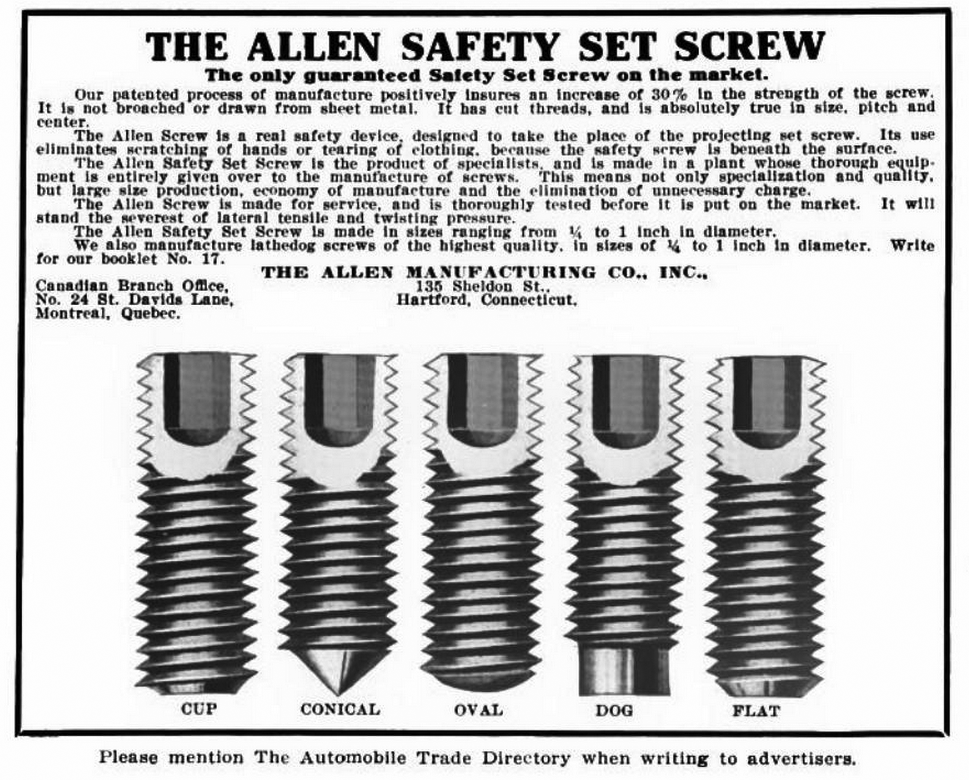
This advertisement from 1913 illustrates various set screw point types

Set screws appear with a variety of tip (point) types. The different shaped tips have different properties that engineers can utilize. If an engineer were to use a detent to ensure proper nesting of the screw, they might choose to use a cone point type of screw. One might often need to use a flat point when the screw must press perfectly flat against a surface. The most common type is the cup point. This type works well because the surface is rounded so that a small surface area is in contact, but it does not have extremely high stress at one point like that of a cone point. Durability studies show that the cup point offers superior resistance to wear while maintaining a strong grip. Knurled cup points offer the added advantage of a locking action (similar to that of a serrated lock washer) that prevents the screws from working loose in high-vibration applications.

Common points include the following:

- Flat point
- Domed point
- Cone point
- Cup point
- Extended point (pilot point, dog point)
- Knurled cup point

=== Knurled cup point ===
Knurl point screws are generally used to secure one object within another. The serrated ridge on the knurl cup set screw helps reduce loosening due to vibration. The knurled point combines digging action of the cup point with counter-clockwise locking knurls that have a ratchet-locking action which helps resist loosening, even under the most severe vibrations.

Knurl point set screws should not be reused because the cutting edges of the knurls are deflected when tightened. During removal, the cutting edges are torn and no longer have full strength to resist unscrewing. ISO standard for Knurled cup point set screw is ISO 4029.

== Drive types ==
Set screws are made with a variety of drive styles, including the following:

- Straight slot
- Hex socket
- Square socket
- External hex
- External square
- Bristol spline

== History ==
The concept of set screws is centuries old, predating the metal screw by at least several hundred years. Early materials included wood, bone, horn, antler and ivory.

Headless set screws have been around for a long time, with the straight slot being the oldest drive type (due to its ease of machining), but the demand for headless set screws experienced a marked increase in the first and second decades of the 20th century, when a penchant for better industrial safety, a campaign with the slogan "safety first", swept the industrialized nations of North America and Europe as a part of the larger Progressive Movement. This surge in safety consciousness was a backlash against the often-atrocious industrial safety standards of the era. H.T. Hallowell, Sr., a U.S. industrialist whose corporation was one of several that pioneered the commercialization of the hex socket drive, noted in his memoir that line shafting, which was ubiquitous in the industrial practice of the time, often had headed set screws (with external-wrenching square drive) holding the many pulleys to the line shafts, and collars holding the shafts from axial movement. Gear trains of exposed gears were also common at the time, and those, too, often used headed set screws, holding the gears to the shafts. His company's chief products at the time were shaft hangers and shaft collars of pressed-steel construction. The "safety craze" created a burgeoning demand for headless set screws on pulleys, gears, and collars to replace the headed ones, so that workers' clothing and fingers were less likely to catch on the exposed rotating screw head. It was this heightened demand that prompted Hallowell's firm to get into the screw-making business and to explore socket-head drive designs. With P.L. Robertson holding fresh patent rights on a practical-to-make square-socket drive, the firm soon pursued the hex socket drive.

== Gallery ==
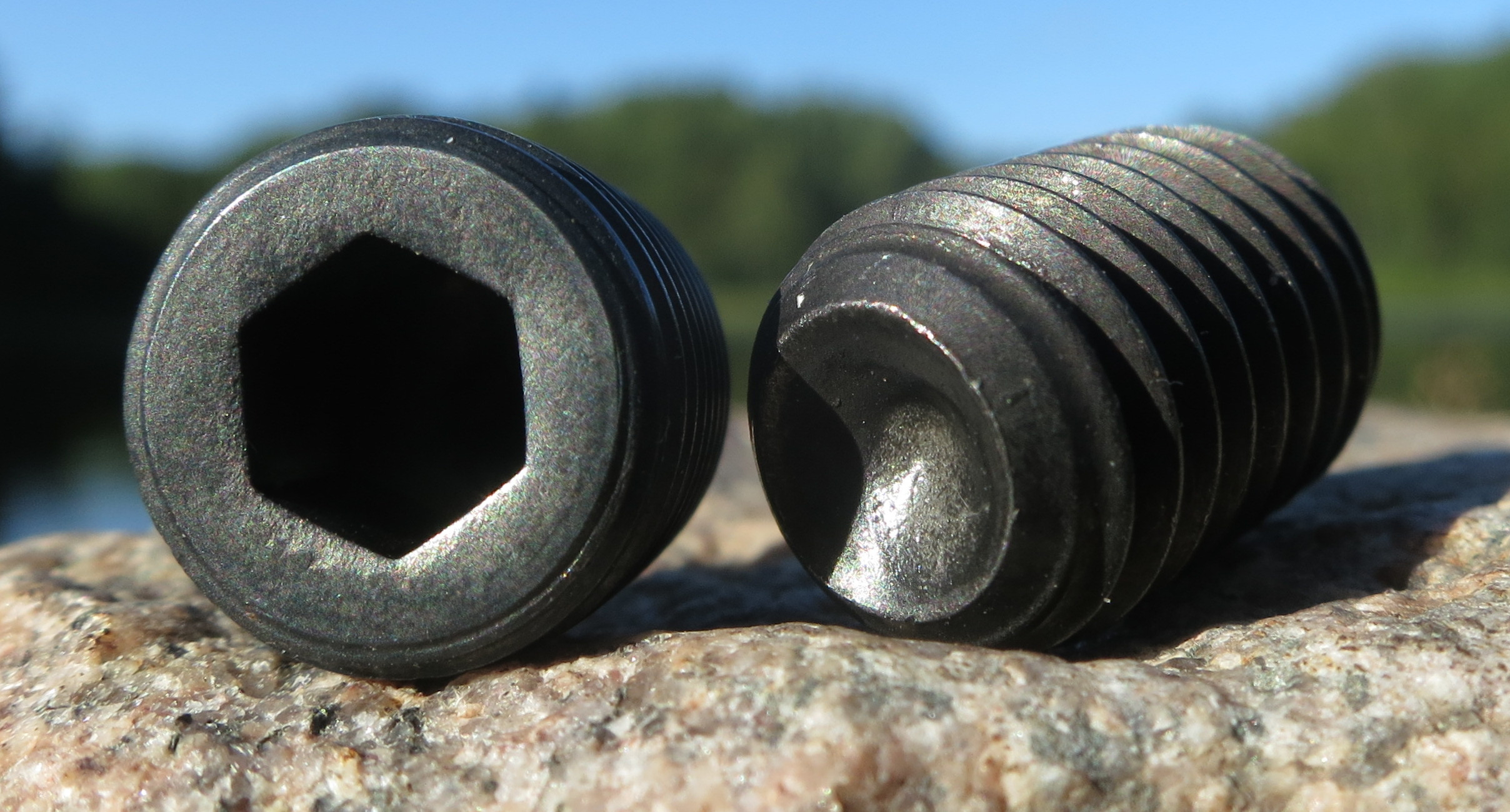
Hex-socketed set screws with cup point.

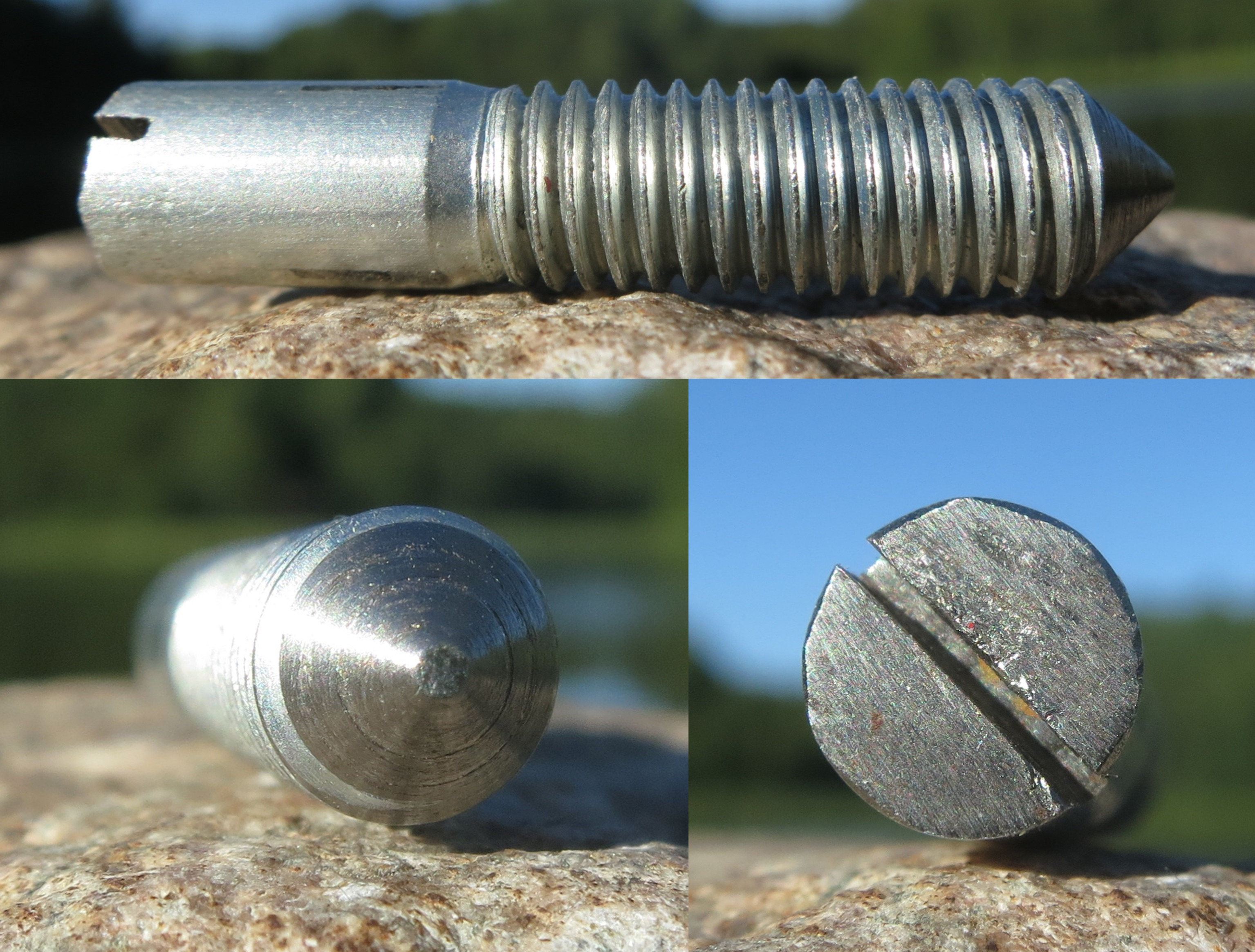
Straight-slotted set screw with cone point.

== See also ==
- Screw
- Screw thread

== Bibliography ==
- Hallowell, Howard Thomas Sr. (1951), How a Farm Boy Built a Successful Corporation: An Autobiography, Jenkintown, Pennsylvania, USA: Standard Pressed Steel Company, LCCN 52001275, OCLC 521866.
