= Hex key =

Driver for hexagonal socketed bolts or screws

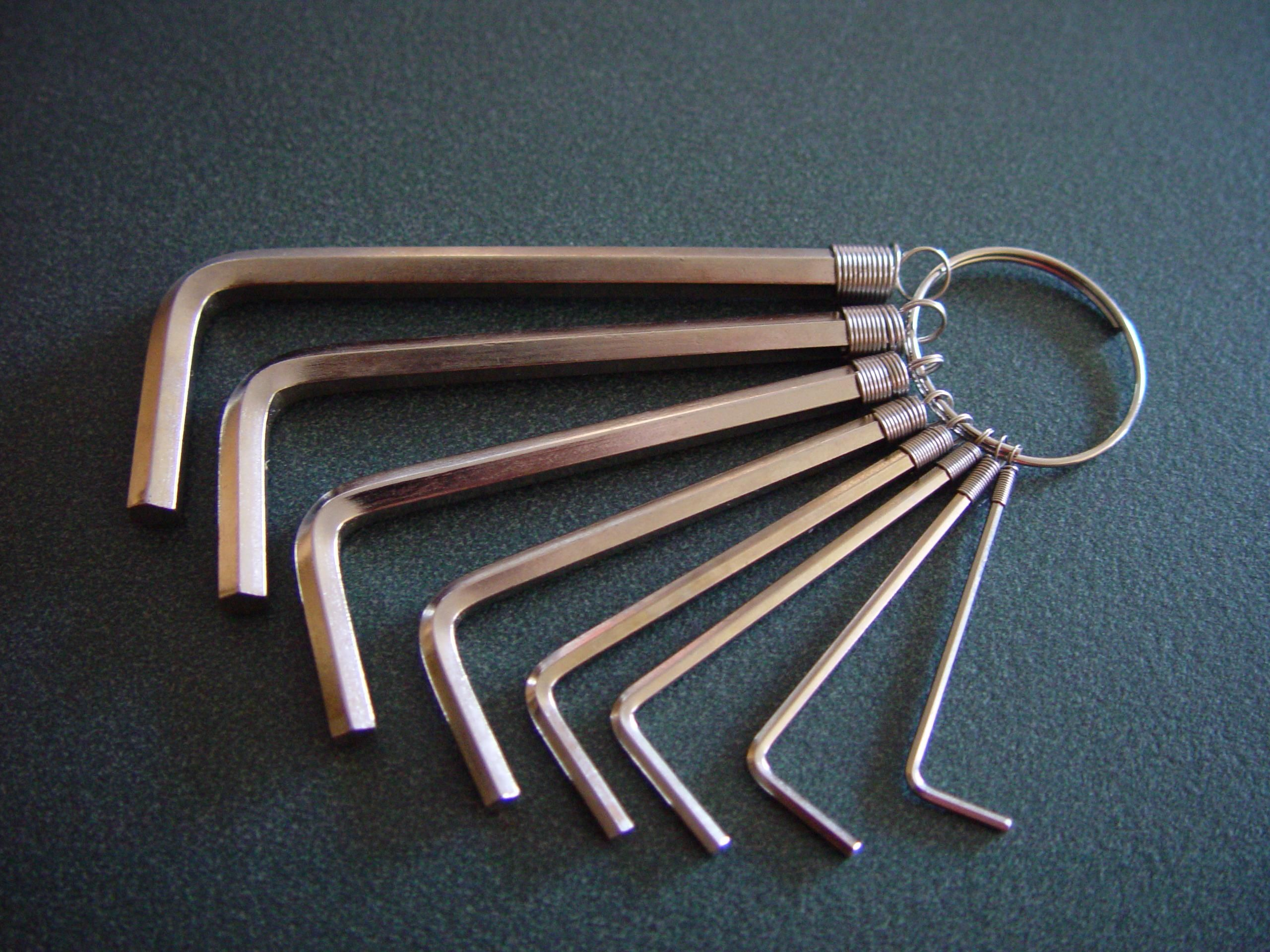
Hex keys of various sizes

A hex key (also hex wrench, Allen key, Allen wrench) is a simple driver for bolts or screws that have heads with internal hexagonal recesses (sockets).

Hex keys are generally formed from a single rod of hard hexagonal steel, having blunt ends that fit snugly into similarly shaped screw sockets. The rod is bent to 90°, forming two arms of unequal length resembling an "L" shape. The tool is usually held and twisted by its long arm, creating a relatively large torque at the tip of the short arm; it can also be held by its short arm to access screws in difficult-to-reach locations and to turn screws faster at the expense of torque.

Hex keys are designated with a socket size and are manufactured with tight tolerances. As such, they are usually sold in kits that include a variety of sizes. Key length typically increases with size but not necessarily proportionally so. Variants on this design have the short end inserted in a transverse handle, which can contain multiple keys of varying sizes that can be folded into the handle when not in use.

While often used generically, the "Allen" name is a registered trademark (circa 1910) of the Allen Manufacturing Company (now Apex Tool Group) of Hartford, Connecticut.

== History ==
The idea of a hex socket screw drive was probably conceived as early as the 1860s to the 1890s, but such screws were probably not manufactured until around 1910. Rybczynski (2000) describes a flurry of patents for alternative drive types in the 1860s to the 1890s in the U.S., which are confirmed to include internal-wrenching square and triangle types (that is, square and triangular sockets), but he explains that these were patented but not manufactured because of the difficulties and expense of doing so at the time.

P. L. Robertson of Milton, Ontario, first commercialized the square socket in 1908, having perfected and patented a suitable cold forming method, using the right material and the right die design. In 1909–1910, William G. Allen also patented a method of cold-forming screw heads around a hexagonal die. Published advertisements for the "Allen safety set screw" by the Allen Manufacturing Company of Hartford, Connecticut, exist from 1910. This is the reason why many refer to the hex key as an Allen key.

In his autobiography, the founder of the Standard Pressed Steel Company (SPS; now SPS Technologies, Inc.), Howard T. Hallowell Sr. presents a version of events in which SPS developed a hex socket drive in-house, independently of Allen, circa 1911. From this came the Unbrako line of products. This account from Hallowell does not mention the Allen patent of 1910 nor the Allen safety set screw product line. Hallowell does describe, however, the same inspiration also mentioned in connection with Allen for a wave of adoption of the hex socket head, beginning with set screws and followed by cap screws. This was an industrial safety campaign, part of the larger Progressive Movement, to get headless set screws onto the pulleys and shafts of the line shafting that was ubiquitous in factories of the day. The headless set screws would be less likely to catch the clothing of workers and pull them into injurious contact with the running shaft.

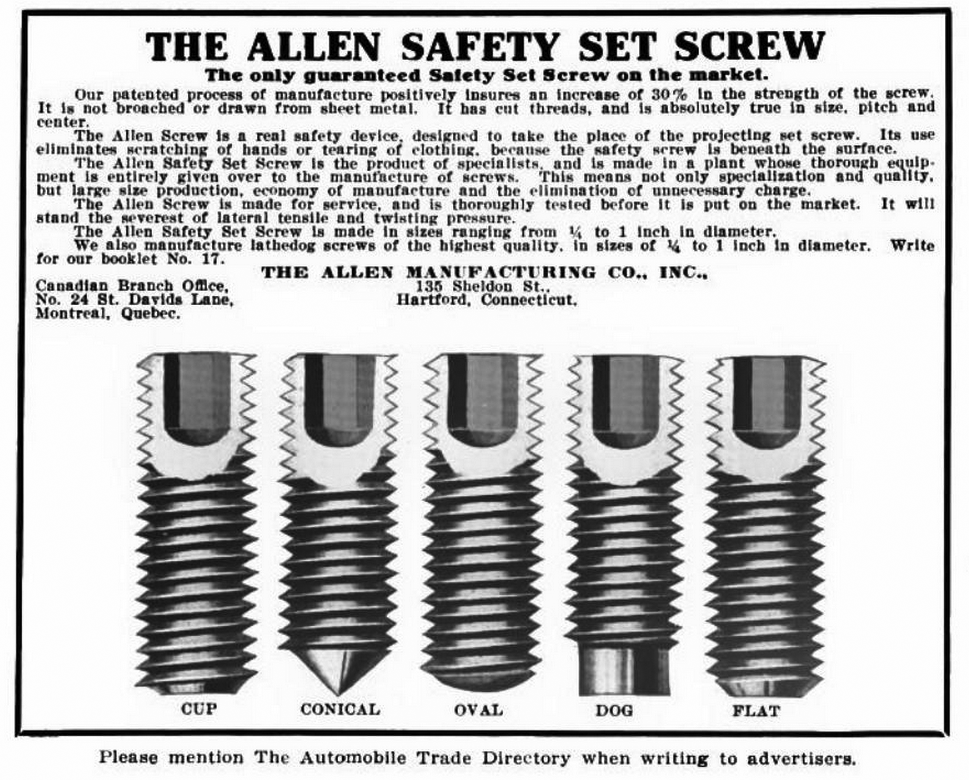
Allen Manufacturing Company Inc advertisement for the Allen Safety Set Screw, a brand of set screw, in the Automobile Trade Directory, January 1913

SPS at the time was a prominent maker of shaft hangers and collars, the latter of which were put in place with set screws. In pursuit of headless set screws with a better drive than a straight slot, Hallowell said, SPS had sourced set screws of square-socket drive from Britain, but they were very expensive. (This was only 2 years after Robertson's Canadian patent.) This cost problem drove SPS to purchase its first screw machine and make its screws in-house, which led to SPS's foray into fastener sales (for which it later became well known within the metalworking industries). Hallowell said "[for] a while we experimented with a screw containing a square hole like the British screw but soon found these would not be acceptable in this country [the U.S.]. Then we decided to incorporate a hexagon socket into the screw […]." Hallowell does not elaborate on why SPS found that the square hole "would not be acceptable in this country", but it seems likely that it would have to have involved licensing Robertson's patent, which would have defeated SPS's purpose of driving down its cost for internal-wrenching screws (and may have been unavailable at any price, as explained at "List of screw drives > Robertson"). The story, if any, of whether SPS's methods required licensing of Allen's 1910 patent is not addressed by Hallowell's memoir. The book does not mention which method—cold forming or linear broaching—was used by SPS in these earliest years. If the latter was used, then Allen's patent would not have been relevant.

Hallowell said that acceptance of the internal-wrenching hexagon drive was slow at first but that it eventually caught on quite strongly. This adoption occurred first in tool and die work and later in other manufacturing fields such as defense (aircraft, tanks, submarines), civilian aircraft, automobiles, bicycles, furniture and others. Concerning the dissemination of the screws and wrenches, Hallowell said "the transition from a square head set screw [Hallowell refers here to the then-ubiquitous external-wrenching square drive] to a hexagon socket head hollow set screw[,] for which had to be developed special keys or wrenches for tightening or loosening the screw, was the cause of more profanity among the mechanics and machine manufacturers than any other single event that happened. […] I am sure that the old-timers who read this book will remember this period vividly." (These transitional growing pains were echoed decades later with the adoption of the Torx drive).

World War II, with its unprecedented push for industrial production of every kind, is probably the event that first put most laypersons in contact with the internal-wrenching hexagon drive. (Popular Science magazine would note in 1946 "Cap screws and setscrews with heads recessed to take hexagonal-bar wrenches are coming into increasing use.")

== Features ==
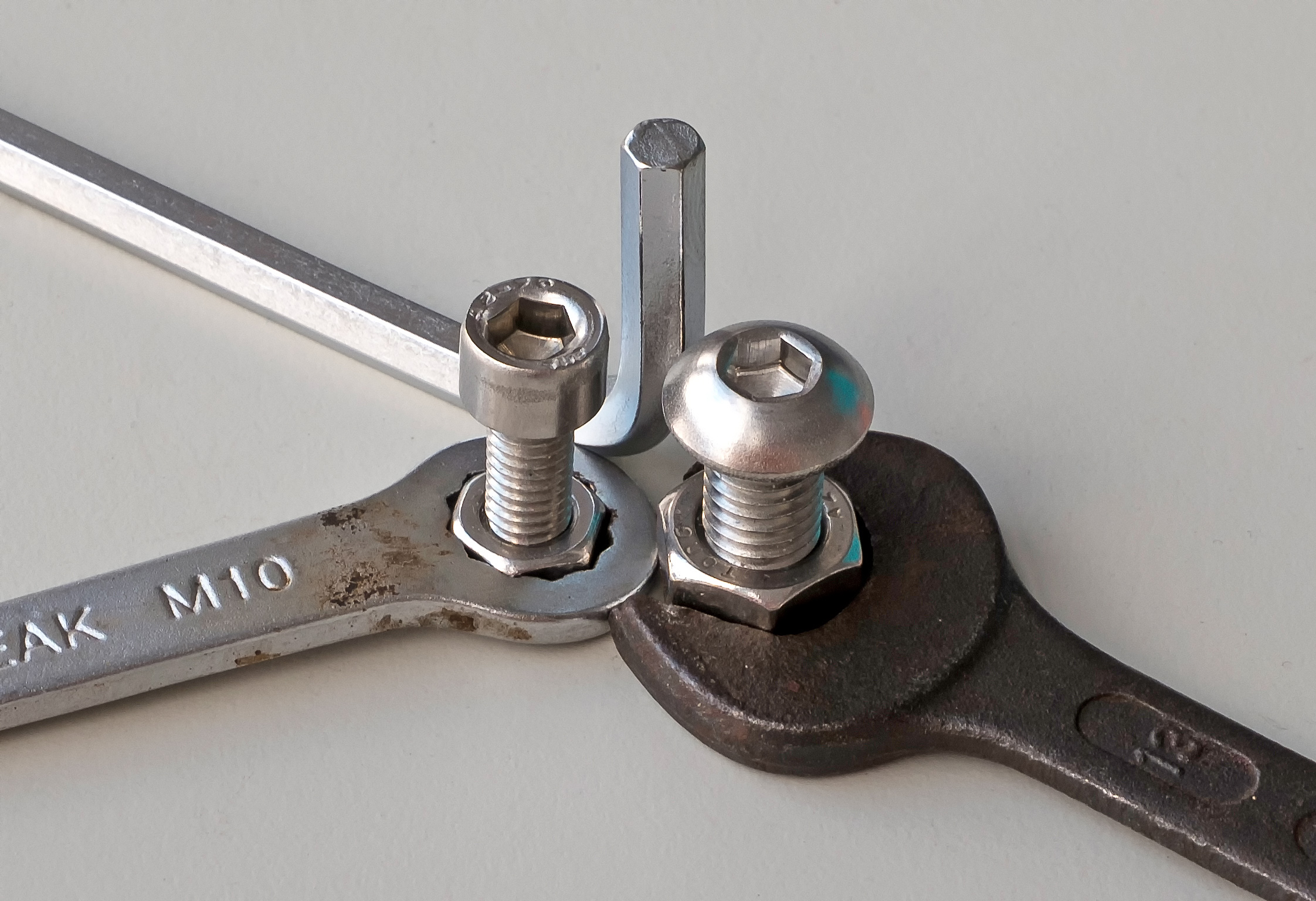
Same hex key, different screw threads

Some features of hex keys are:

- The tool is simple, small and light.
- The contact surfaces of the screw or bolt are protected from external damage.
- There are six contact surfaces between bolt and driver.
- Very small bolt heads can be accommodated.
- The tool allows the use of headless and recessed-head screws.
- The screw can be held by the key while it is inserted into its hole.
- The torque applied to the screw is constrained by the length and thickness of the key.
- The tool is cheap to manufacture, so it can be included with products requiring end-user assembly.
- Either end of the tool can be used to take advantage of reach or torque.
- The tool can be reconditioned by grinding off the worn-out end.

== Nomenclature ==
Cap head screws of various sizes

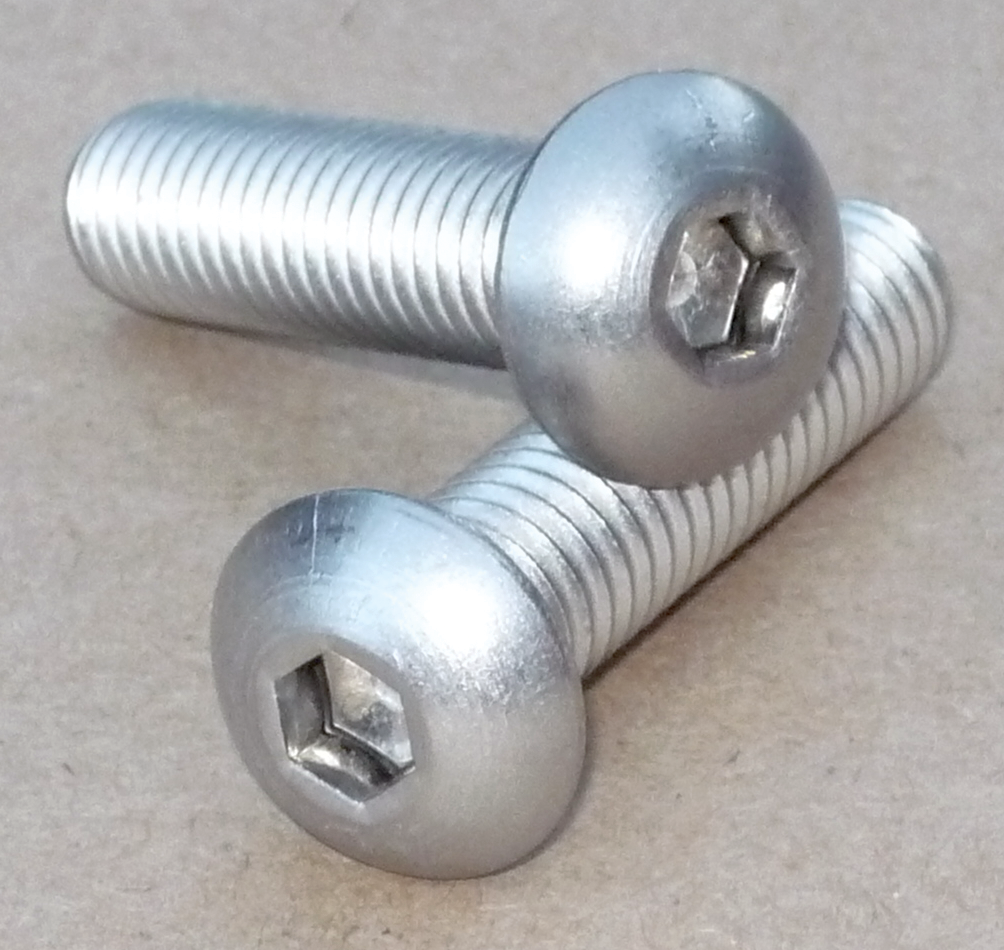
Button head screws

Hex keys are best known as "Allen keys" or "Allen wrenches" in English-speaking countries like the UK, Australia, Canada and the U.S., and in Spanish-speaking countries such as Spain and Mexico. (The "Allen" name is a registered trademark, originated by the Allen Manufacturing Company of Hartford, Connecticut, circa 1910. The brand is now owned by Apex Tool Group, LLC, which was acquired by Bain Capital in 2014.)

In Germany the term "INBUS" is a registered trademark, originally an acronym for Innensechskantschraube Bauer und Schaurte, introduced in 1934 by the German company Bauer & Schaurte, in 2015 acquired by INBUS IP GmbH, Breckerfeld, Germany). INBUS IP GmbH was registered with the stated purpose of holding and licensing the trademark INBUS. In late 2015 to early 2016, the company sent out desist orders to companies using the name "Inbus" for hex keys. Hex keys with the INBUS brand are now manufactured at HaFu Werkzeugfabrik H. J. Fuhrmann GmbH, Breckerfeld, North Rhine-Westphalia, as of 2017 accounting for 7% of the company's EUR 8 million turnover and as "Unbrako" key or wrench in Scandinavia (originally a Pennsylvania company established in 1911, in 2008 acquired by Deepak Fasteners Limited). In Italy, it is known as brugola, for the company Officine Egidio Brugola (established 1926). In 1946 Egidio Brugola patented an important variant with a spiral shank.

The term "hex-head" is sometimes used to refer to this type of drive, but this use is not consistent with its more conventional use referring to external-wrenching hexagons.

== Sizing ==
Hex keys are measured across-flats (AF), which is the distance between two opposite (parallel) sides of the hexagon.

=== Metric ===
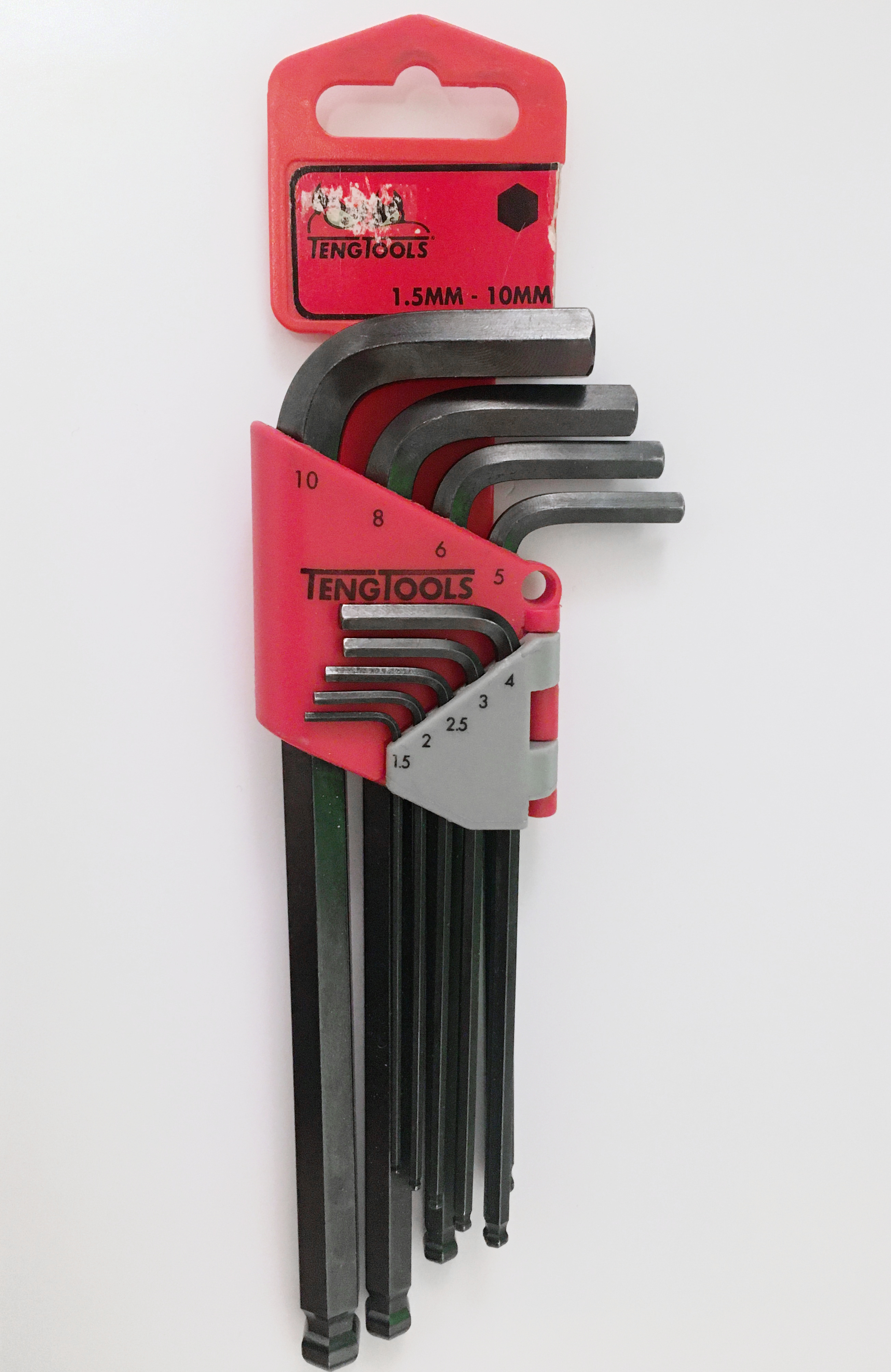
Metric hex key set with sizes from 1.5 mm to 10 mm

Standard metric sizes are defined in ISO 2936:2014 "Assembly tools for screws and nuts—Hexagon socket screw keys", also known as DIN 911.

Common metric hex key sizes
Metric (mm)	US Customary	
Metric (mm)	Conversion (in)	Substitution (in)
0.7	0.028	
0.9	0.035	
1.3	0.051	
1.5	0.059	
2	0.079	5/64
2.5	0.098	
3	0.118	
4	0.157	5/32
5	0.197	
6	0.236	
8	0.315	5/16
10	0.394	
12	0.472	
14	0.551	
17	0.669	
19	0.748	3/4

The full set of defined sizes are:

- 0.7 mm, 0.9 mm, 1.3 mm
- 1.5 to 5 mm in 0.5 mm increments
- 5 mm to 19 mm in 1 mm increments
- 21 mm, 22 mm, 23 mm, 24 mm, 27 mm, 29 mm, 30 mm, 32 mm, and 36 mm.

=== US customary ===
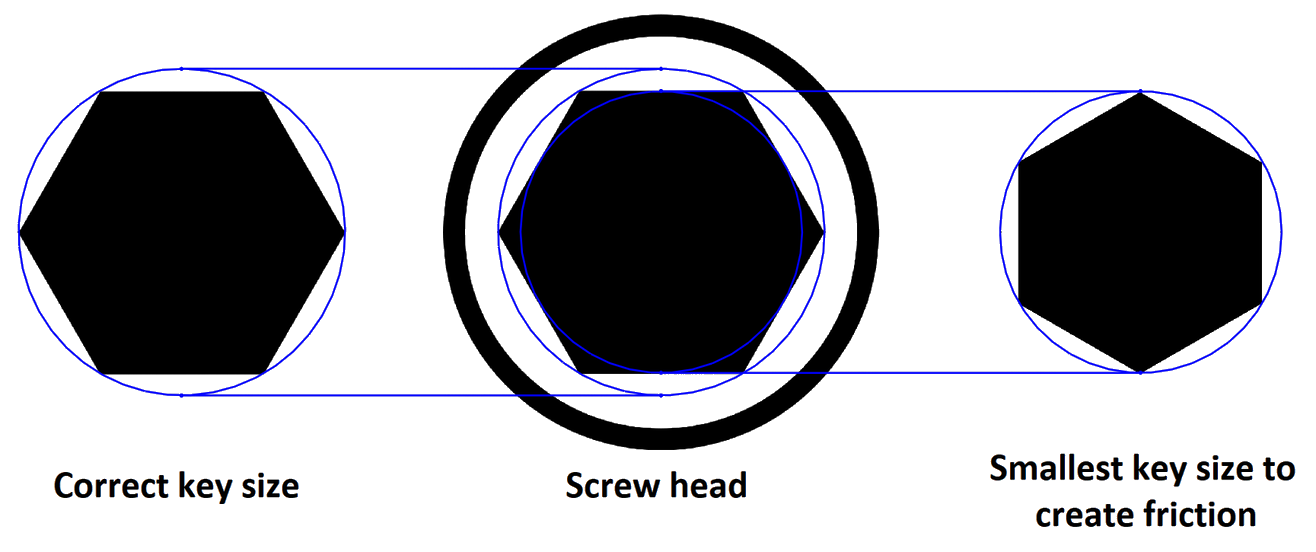
Illustration of the largest (left) and smallest (right) hex keys that can be used with a given hex screw (middle)

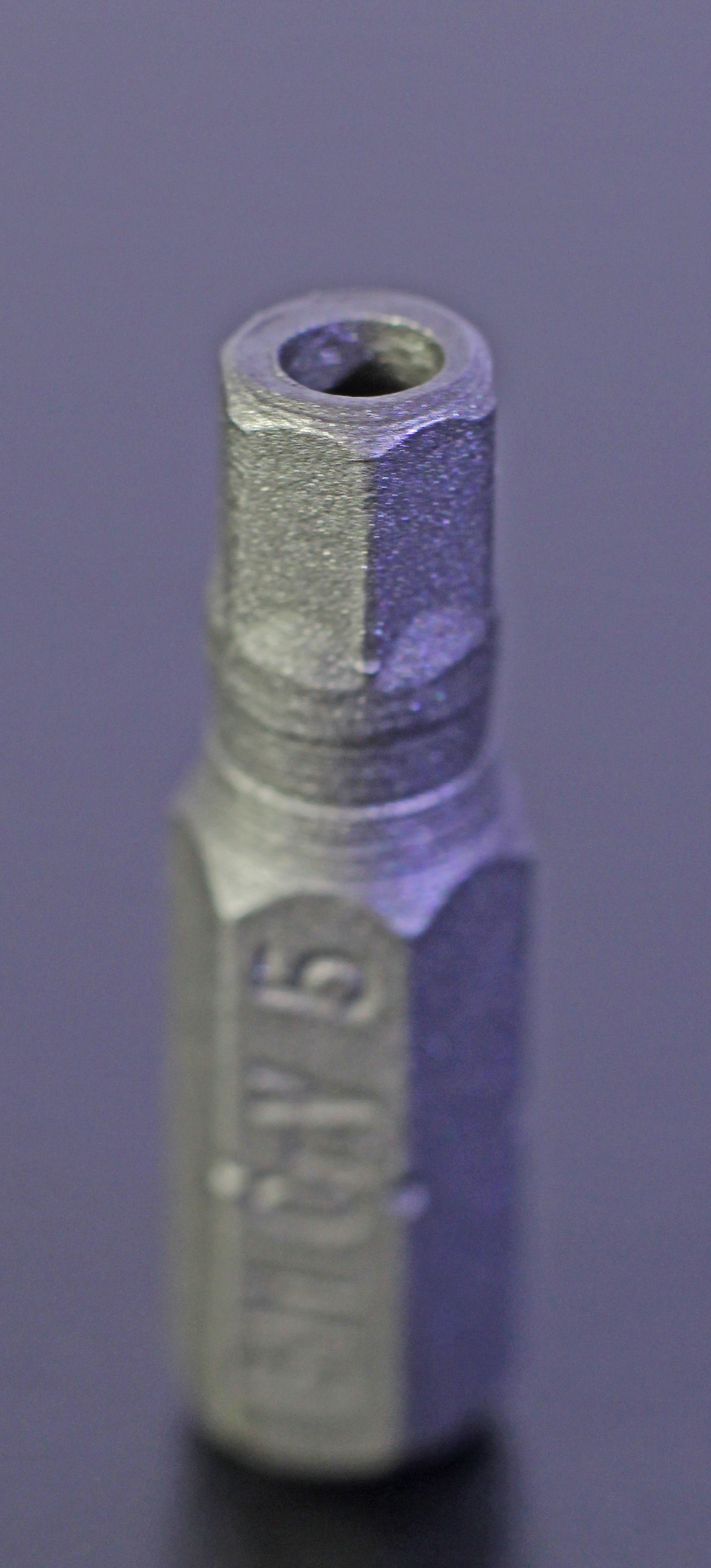
Security hex key

Hex key sizes in the U.S. are defined in ANSI/ASME standard B18.3-1998 "Socket Cap, Shoulder, and Set Screws (Inch Series)"

Common US customary hex key sizes
US Customary (in)	Metric	
US Customary (in)	Conversion (mm)	Substitution (mm)
0.028	0.711	0.7
0.035	0.889	0.9
0.050	1.270	1.3
1/16	1.588	
5/64	1.984	2
3/32	2.381	
7/64	2.778	
1/8	3.175	
9/64	3.572	
5/32	3.969	4
3/16	4.763	
7/32	5.556	
1/4	6.350	
5/16	7.938	8
3/8	9.525	

=== Variants ===
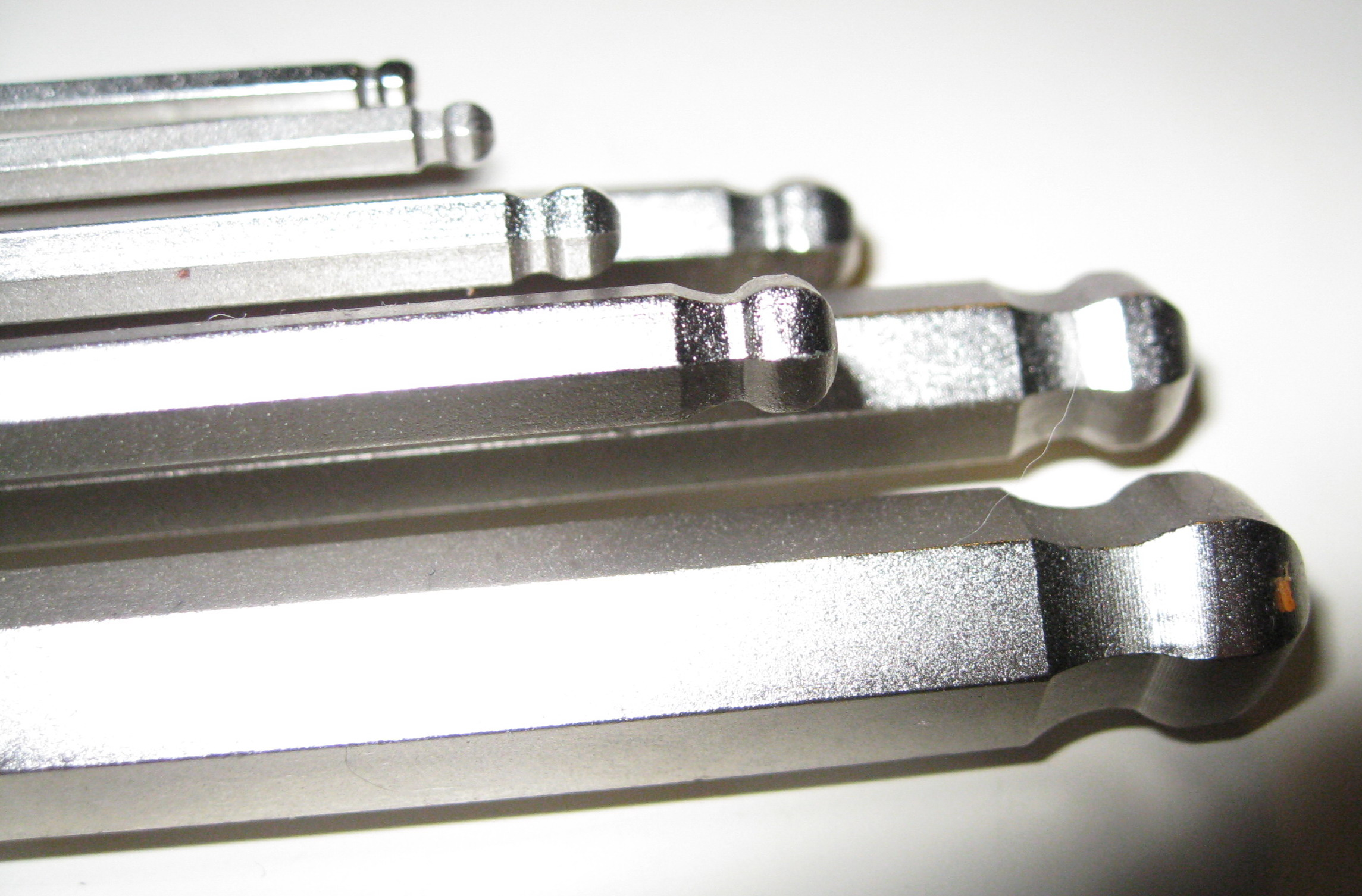
Hex keys of various sizes with ball ends

Tamper-resistant hex screws have a protruding pin in the center of the hex recess that prevents insertion of standard hex keys; as such, they can only be fastened and removed with a special key that has a recess for the pin. A similar "center pin reject" security feature is also used on torx screws.

Some hex keys have a rounded end, allowing them to be used at an angle off-axis to the screw. This type of hex key was invented in 1964 by the Bondhus Corporation and is manufactured by several companies. While providing access to otherwise inaccessible screws, thinning of the tool shaft to create the rounded shape renders it weaker than the straight-shaft version, limiting the torque that can be applied; in addition, the rounded end only makes point contact with the screw as opposed to the line contact made by straight-shaft keys.

== Manufacturing methods ==
Hex socket screw heads are usually made by stamping the head with a die, plastically deforming the metal. Other ways to generate the hex socket include linear broaching and rotary broaching. Broaching the heads with a linear broach is essentially the metalworking analog of mortising wood with a mortising machine; a hole is drilled and then the corners are broached out. This operation often leaves little telltale curled chips still attached at the bottom of the socket. These are negligible for most applications.

Hex keys are made by imparting the hexagon cross-section to steel wire (for example, with a drawing die), then bending and shearing.

== See also ==
- List of screw drives
- Wrench

== Bibliography ==
- Burton, Walter E. (February 1946), "Hold Everything", Popular Science, vol. 148, no. 2, New York, NY, USA.
- Hallowell, Howard Thomas Sr (1951), How a Farm Boy Built a Successful Corporation: An Autobiography, Jenkintown, Pennsylvania, USA: Standard Pressed Steel Company, LCCN 52001275, OCLC 521866.
- Rybczynski, Witold (2000). One Good Turn: A Natural History of the Screwdriver and the Screw. Scribner. ISBN 978-0-684-86729-8. LCCN 00036988.
