= Screwdriver =

Hand tool used for turning screws

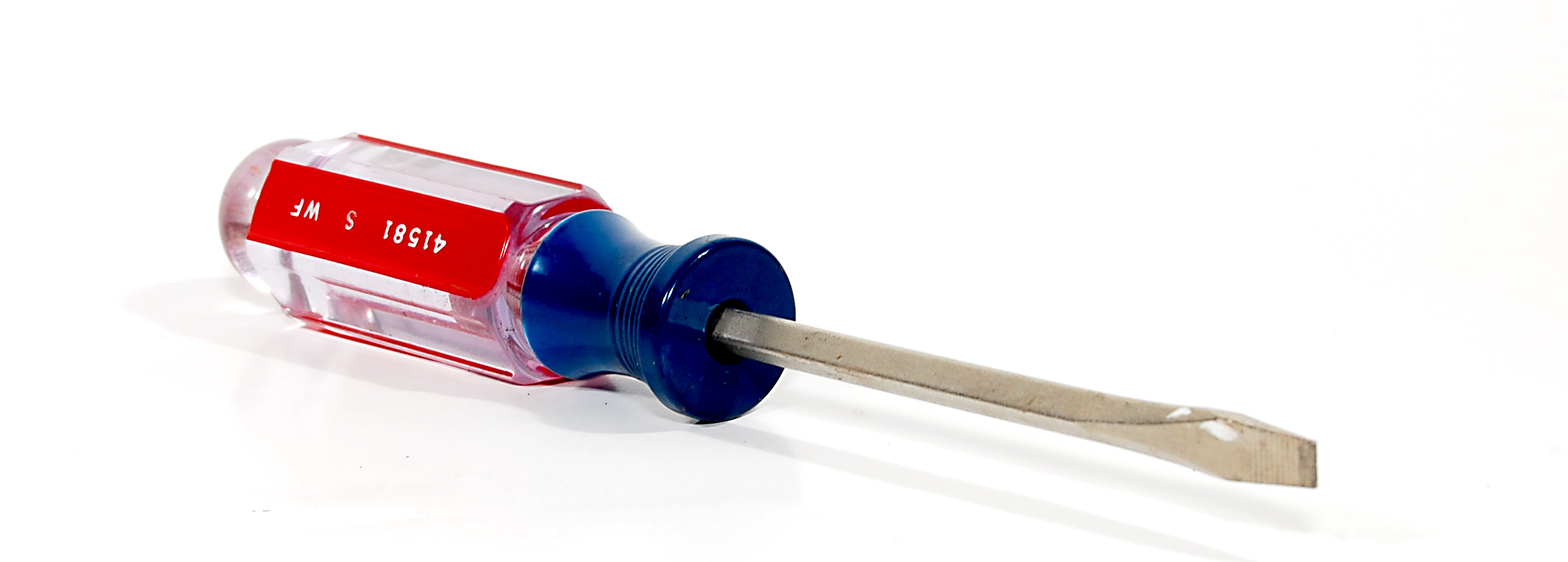
- A slotted or "flat-head" screwdriver
- Other names: Turnscrew
- Classification: Hand tool
- Types: See List of screw drives
- Related: Hex key Wrench

A screwdriver is a tool, manual or powered, used for turning screws.

== Description ==
A typical simple screwdriver has a handle and a shaft, ending in a tip the user puts into the screw head before turning the handle. This form of the screwdriver has been replaced in many workplaces and homes with a more modern and versatile tool, a power drill, as they are quicker, easier, and can also drill holes. The shaft is usually made of tough steel to resist bending or twisting. The tip may be hardened to resist wear, treated with a dark tip coating for improved visual contrast between tip and screw—or ridged or treated for additional "grip".

Handles are typically wood, metal, or plastic and usually hexagonal, square, or oval in cross-section to improve grip and prevent the tool from rolling when set down. Some manual screwdrivers have interchangeable tips that fit into a socket on the end of the shaft and are held in mechanically or magnetically. These often have a hollow handle that contains various types and sizes of tips, and a reversible ratchet action that allows multiple full turns without repositioning the tip or the user's hand.

A screwdriver is classified by its tip, which is shaped to fit the driving surfaces (slots, grooves, recesses, etc.) on the corresponding screw head. Proper use requires that the screwdriver's tip engage the head of a screw of the same size and type designation as the screwdriver tip. Screwdriver tips are available in a wide variety of types and sizes (List of screw drives). The two most common are the simple 'blade'-type for slotted screws, and Phillips, generically called "cross-recess", "cross-head", or "cross-point".

A wide variety of power screwdrivers ranges from a simple "stick"-type with batteries, a motor, and a tip holder all inline, to powerful "pistol" type VSR (variable-speed reversible) cordless drills that also function as screwdrivers. This is particularly useful as drilling a pilot hole before driving a screw is a common operation. Special combination drill-driver bits and adapters let an operator rapidly alternate between the two. Variations include impact drivers, which provide two types of 'hammering' force for improved performance in certain situations, and "right-angle" drivers for use in tight spaces. Many options and enhancements, such as built-in bubble levels, high/low gear selection, magnetic screw holders, adjustable-torque clutches, keyless chucks, "gyroscopic" control, etc., are available.

== History ==
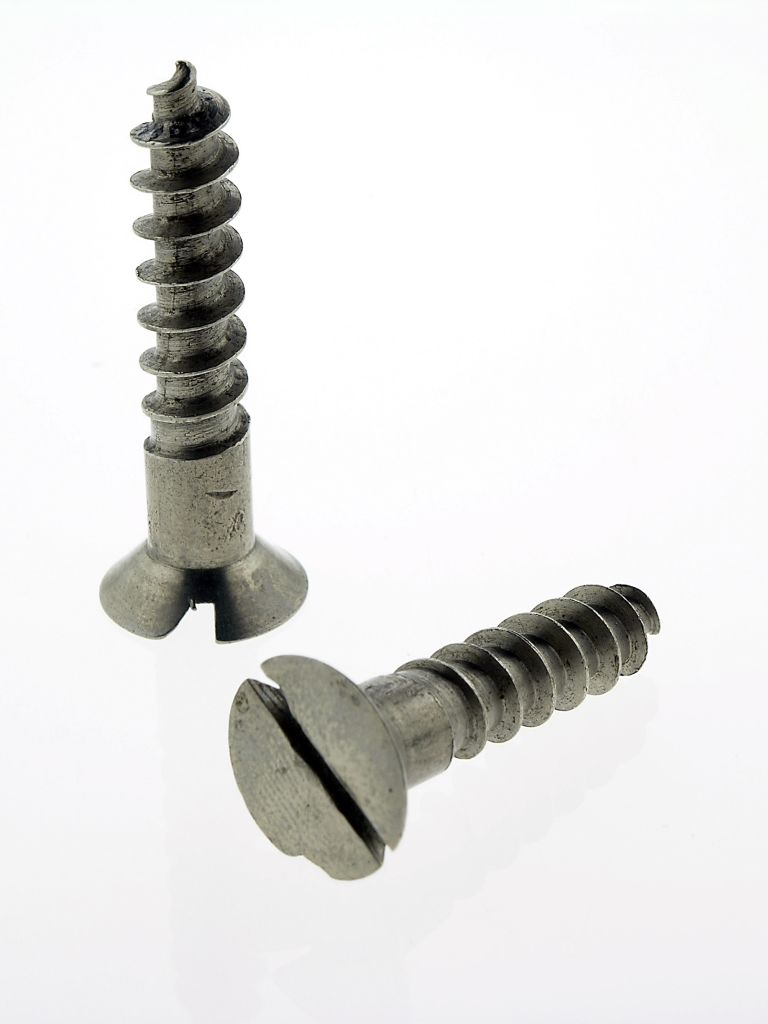
Slotted screws

The earliest documented screwdrivers were used in the late Middle Ages. They were probably invented in the late 15th century, either in Germany or France. The tool's original names in German and French were Schraubendreher (screw-turner) and tournevis (turnscrew), respectively. The first documentation of the tool is in the medieval Housebook of Wolfegg Castle, a manuscript written sometime between 1475 and 1490. These earliest screwdrivers had pear-shaped handles and were made for slotted screws (diversification of the many types of screwdrivers did not emerge until the Gilded Age). The screwdriver remained inconspicuous, however, as evidence of its existence throughout the next 300 years is based primarily on the presence of screws.

Screws were used in the 15th century to construct screw-cutting lathes, for securing breastplates, backplates, and helmets on medieval jousting armor—and eventually for multiple parts of the emerging firearms, particularly the matchlock. Screws, hence screwdrivers, were not used in full combat armor, most likely to give the wearer freedom of movement.

The jaws that hold the pyrites inside wheellock guns were secured with screws, and the need to constantly replace the pyrites resulted in a considerable refinement of the screwdriver. The tool is more documented in France, and took on many shapes and sizes, though all for slotted screws. There were large, heavy-duty screwdrivers for building and repairing large machines, and smaller screwdrivers for refined cabinet work.

The screwdriver depended entirely on the screw, and it took several advances to make the screw easy enough to produce to become popular and widespread. The most popular door hinge at the time was the butt-hinge, but it was considered a luxury. The butt-hinge was handmade, and its constant motion required the security of a screw.

Screws were very hard to produce before the First Industrial Revolution, requiring the manufacture of a conical helix. The brothers Job and William Wyatt found a way to produce a screw on a novel machine that first cut the slotted head, and then cut the helix. Though their business ultimately failed, their contribution to low-cost manufacturing of the screw ultimately led to a vast increase in the screw and the screwdriver's popularity. The increase in popularity gradually led to refinement and eventually diversification of the screwdriver. Refinement of the precision of screws also significantly contributed to the boom in production, mostly by increasing its efficiency and standardizing sizes, important precursors to industrial manufacture.

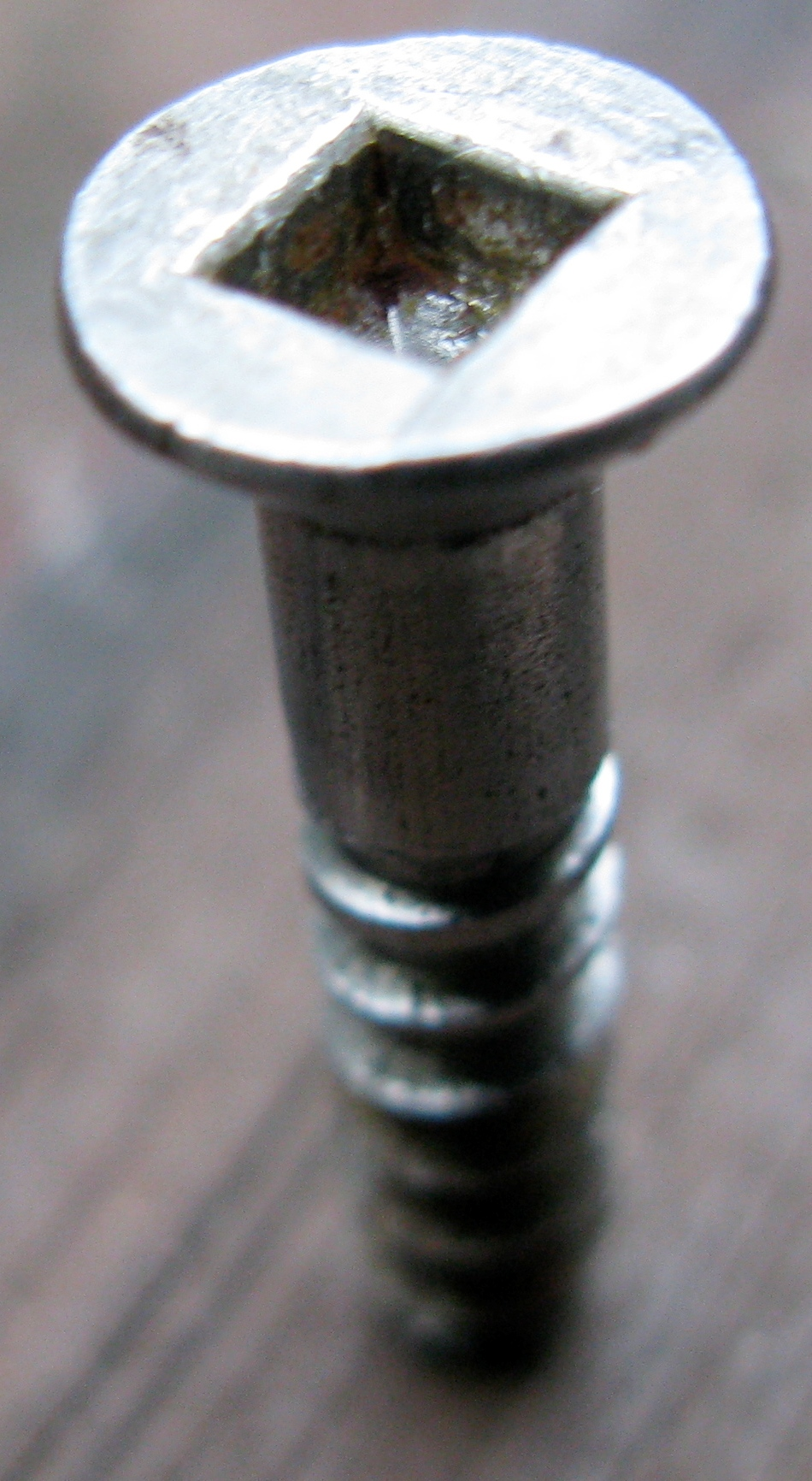
Robertson screw

Canadian P.L. Robertson, though he was not the first person to patent the idea of socket-head screws, was the first to successfully commercialize them, starting in 1908. Socket screws rapidly grew in popularity, and are still used for their resistance to wear and tear, compatibility with hex keys, and ability to stop a power tool when set. Though immensely popular, Robertson had trouble marketing his invention to the newly booming auto industry, for he was unwilling to relinquish his patents.

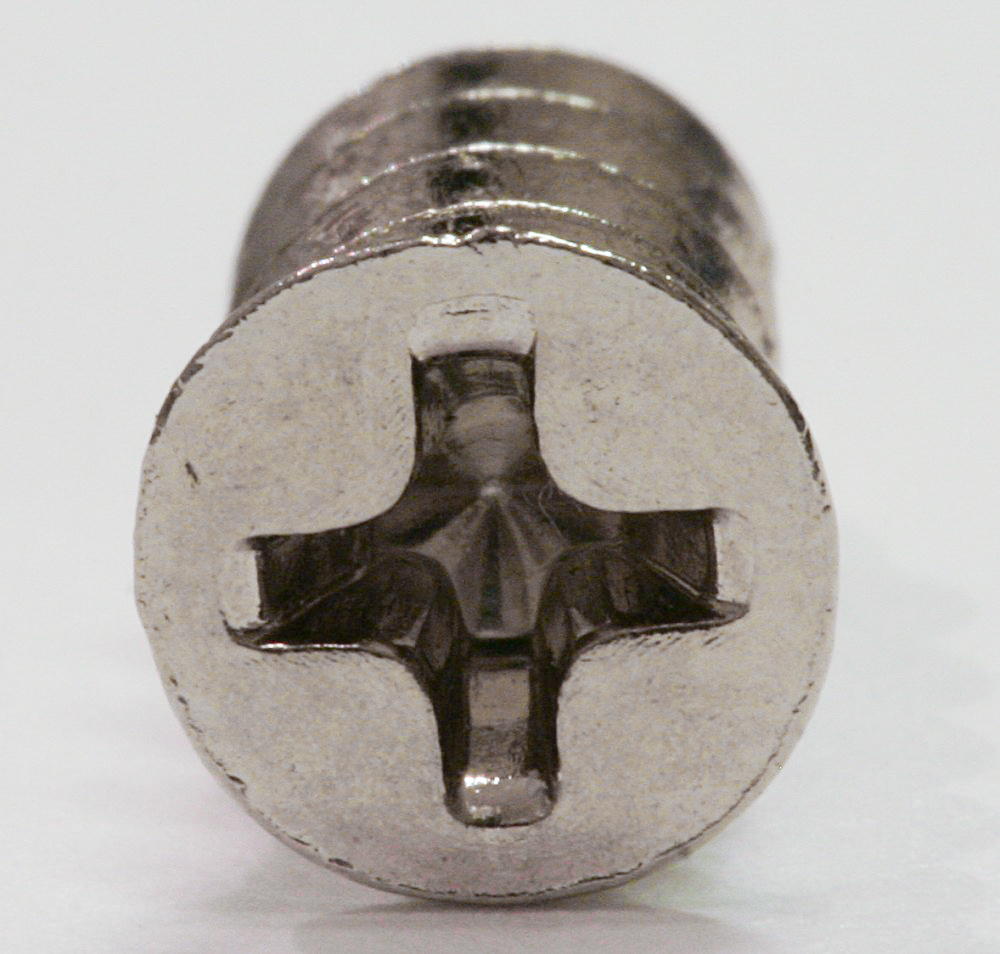
Phillips screw head

In 1932, in Portland, Oregon, Henry F. Phillips patented what today is known as the Phillips Screw, working with the patent's author John P. Thompson. It featured an improved version of a deep socket with a cruciform slot. Phillips offered his screw to the American Screw Company, and after a successful trial on the 1936 Cadillac, it quickly swept through the American auto industry. With the Industrial Revival at the end of the Great Depression and the upheaval of World War II, the Phillips screw quickly became, and remains, the most popular screw in the world. A main advantage of the Phillips screws and screwdrivers was the combination that they were self centering and less prone to slipping thus better than slotted screws, and that conventional slotted screwdrivers could also be used on the screws, which was not possible with the Robertson Screw or other socket-head screws.

Gunsmiths still call a screwdriver a turnscrew, under which name it is an important part of a set of pistols. The name was common in earlier centuries, used by cabinetmakers, shipwrights, and perhaps other trades.

The cabinetmaker's screwdriver is one of the longest-established handle forms, somewhat oval or ellipsoid in cross-section. This is variously attributed to improving grip or preventing the tool rolling off the bench. The shape has been popular for a couple of hundred years. It is usually associated with a plain head for slotted screws, but has been used with many head forms. Modern plastic screwdrivers use a handle with a roughly hexagonal cross-section to achieve these same two goals, a far cry from the pear-shaped handle of the original 15th-century screwdriver.

== Handle ==
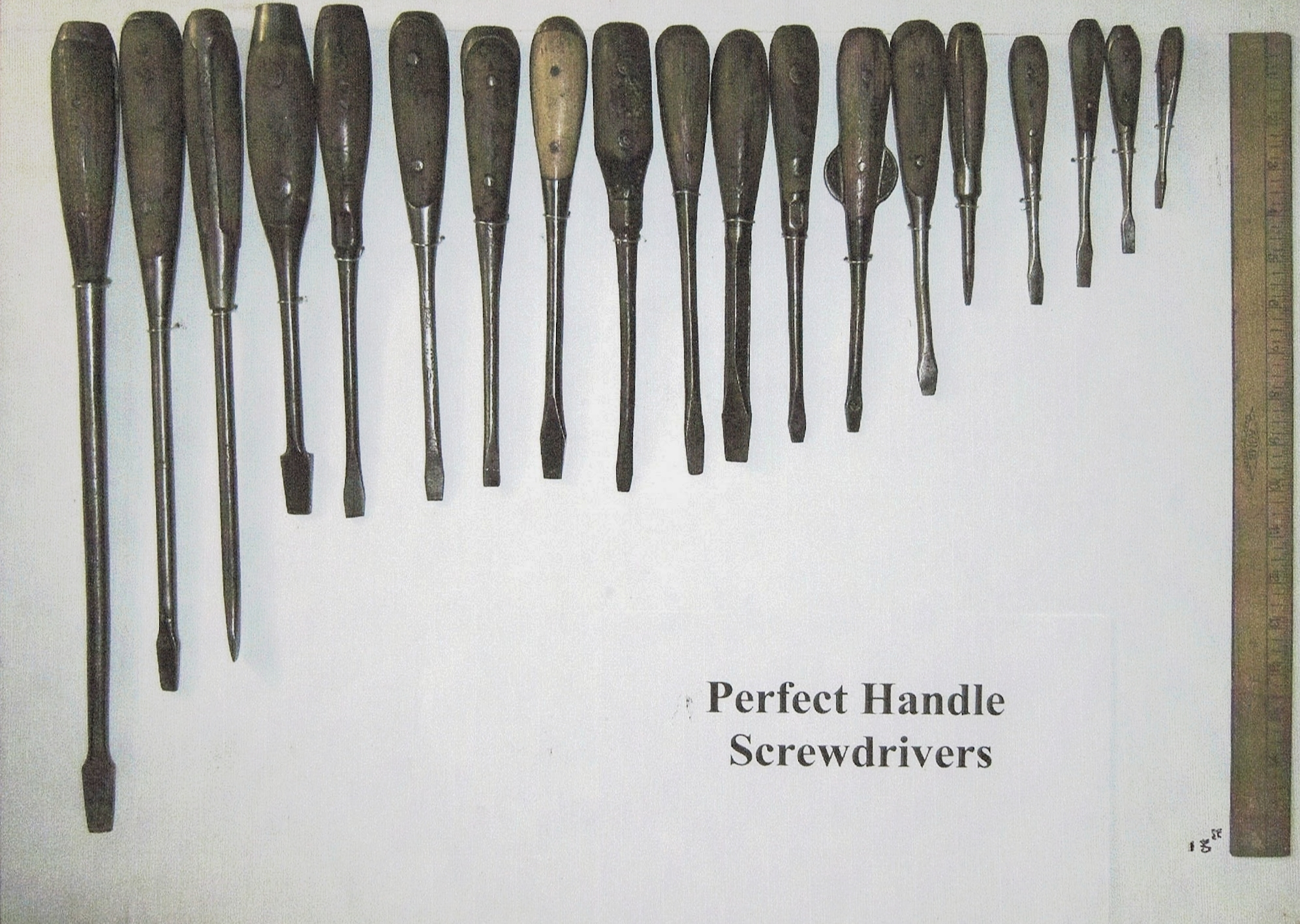
"Perfect Handle" screwdrivers

The handle and shaft of screwdrivers have changed considerably over time. The design is influenced by both purpose and manufacturing requirements. The "Perfect Pattern Handle" screwdriver was first manufactured by HD Smith & Company, which operated from 1850 to 1900. Many manufacturers adopted this handle design. At the time, the "flat bladed" screw type was prevalent and was the fastener with which they were designed to be used. Another popular design was composed of drop-forged steel with riveted wood handles.

The shape and material of many modern screwdriver handles are designed to fit comfortably in the user's hand, for user comfort and to facilitate maximum control and torque. Designs include indentations for the user's fingers, and surfaces of a soft material such as thermoplastic elastomer to increase comfort and grip. Composite handles of rigid plastic and rubber are also common. Many screwdriver handles are not smooth and often not round, but have flats or other irregularities to improve grip and to prevent the tool from rolling when on a flat surface.

Some screwdrivers have a short hexagonal section at the top of the blade, adjacent to the handle, so that a ring spanner or open wrench can be used to increase the applied torque. Another option are "cabinet" screwdrivers which are made of flat bar stock and while the shaft may be rounded, will have a large flat section adjacent to the handle which a wrench (often an adjustable) may be used on for additional leverage. The offset screwdriver has a handle set at right angles to the small blade, providing access to narrow spaces and giving extra torque.

== Drive tip ==
Screwdrivers come in a large range of sizes to accommodate various screws—from tiny jeweller's screwdrivers up. A screwdriver that is not the right size and type for the screw may damage the screw in the process of tightening it.

Some screwdriver tips are magnetized, enabling them to retain ferromagnetic screws. This aids both insertion and removal, and is particularly useful when handling small screws or working in confined spaces. Many screwdriver designs employ interchangeable tips, known as screwdriver bits, analogous to drill bits. This allows a single handle to be used with multiple bits of varying profiles and dimensions, enhancing the tool’s versatility.

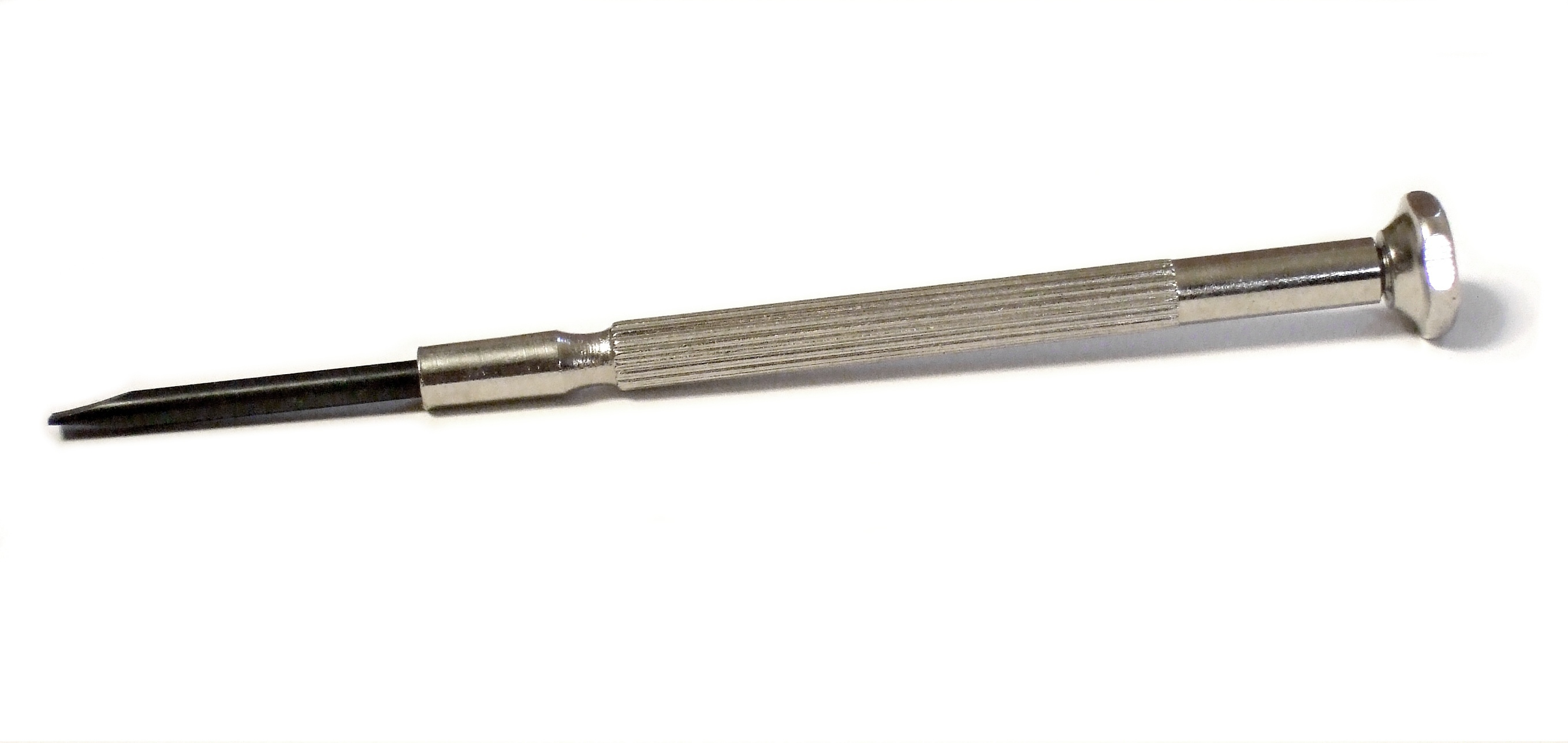
A jeweler's screwdriver

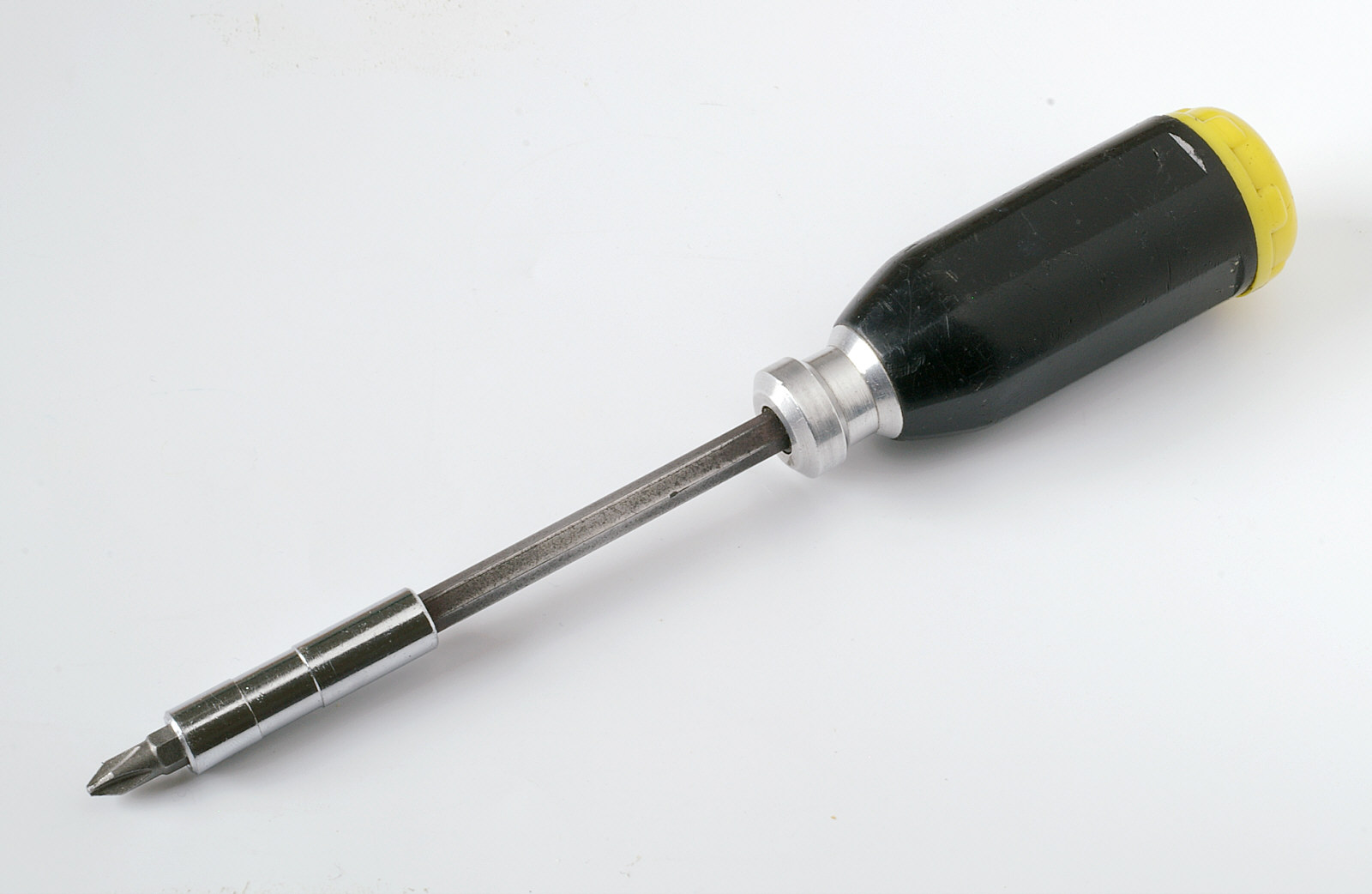
Screwdriver with magnetic tip

=== Slotted ===
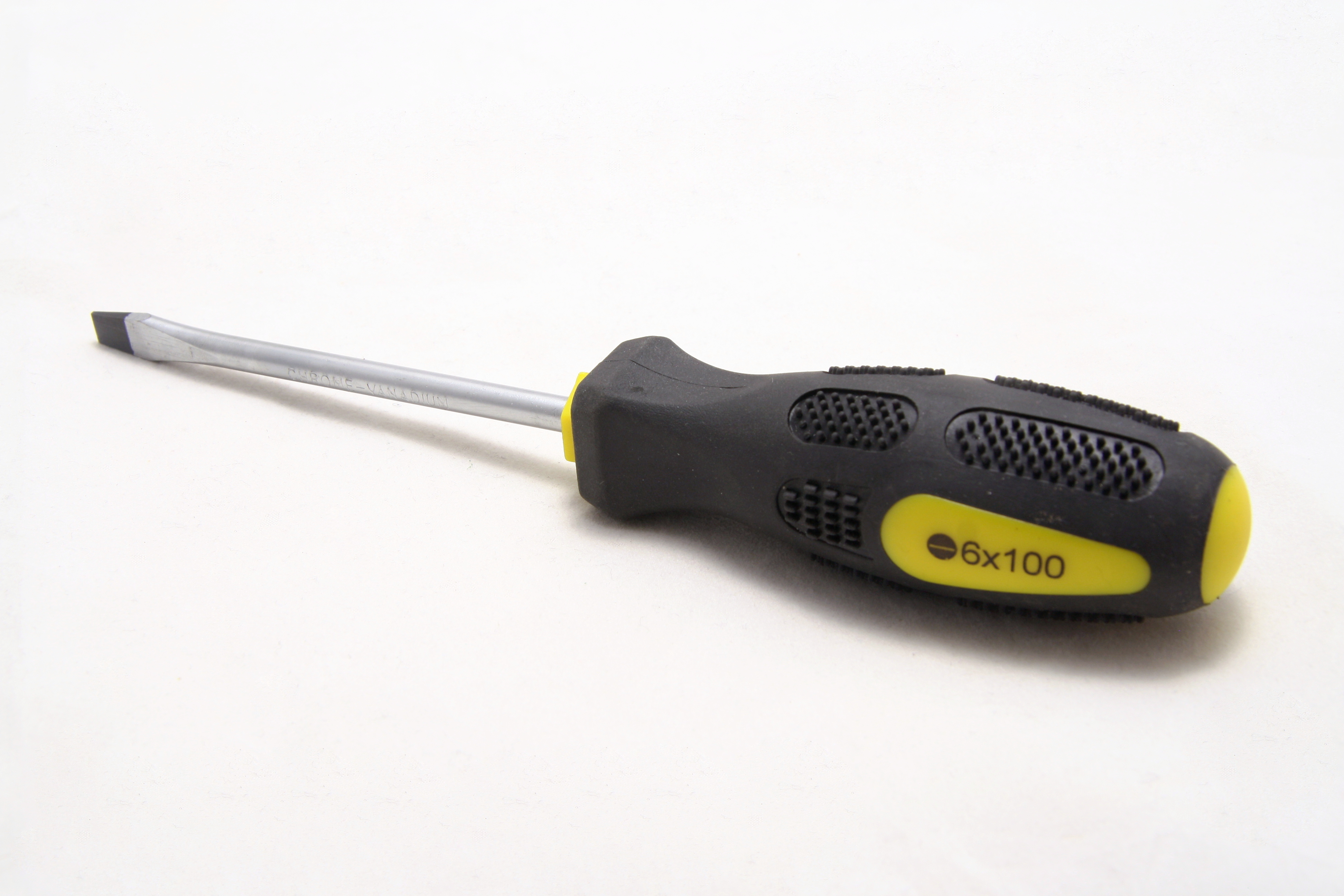
Screwdriver with rubber handle

The tool used to drive a slotted screw head is called a standard, common blade, flat-blade, slot-head, straight, flat, flat-tip, or "flat-head" screwdriver. This last usage can be confusing, because the term flat-head also describes a screw with a flat top, designed to install in a countersunk hole. Before the development of the newer bit types, the flat-blade was called the "Common-Blade", because it was the most common one. Depending on the application, the name of this screwdriver may differ. Within the automotive/heavy electric industries, it is known as a "flat head screwdriver"; within the avionics and mining industries, it is known as a "standard screwdriver". Though there are many names; the original device from 1908 was known as a "flat-head screw turner".

Among slotted screwdrivers, variations at the blade or bit end involve the profile of the blade as viewed face-on (from the side of the tool). The more common type is sometimes called keystone, where the blade profile is slightly flared before tapering off at the end, which provides extra stiffness to the workface and makes it capable of withstanding more torque by gripping deeper in the screw slot. To maximize access in space-restricted applications, the cabinet variant screwdriver blade sides are straight and parallel, reaching the end of the blade at a right angle. This design is also frequently used in jeweler's screwdrivers.

Many textbooks and vocational schools instruct mechanics to grind down the tip of the blade, which, due to the taper, increases its thickness and consequently allows more precise engagement with the slot in the screw. This approach creates a set of graduated slotted screwdrivers that will fit a particular screw for a tighter engagement and reduce screw head deformation. However, many better-quality screwdriver blades are already induction-hardened (surface heat-treated), coated with black-oxide, black-phosphate, or diamond-coated to increase friction between the screwdriver tip and the screw. Thus tip grinding after manufacture will likely compromise their durability so it is best to select the proper tip and avoid weakening the manufacture's treatments.

=== Phillips ===
Phillips screwdrivers come in several standard sizes, ranging from tiny "jeweler's" to those used for automobile frame assembly—or #000 to #4 respectively. This size number is usually stamped onto the shank (shaft) or handle for identification. Each bit size fits a range of screw sizes, more or less well. Each Phillips screwdriver size also has a related shank diameter. The driver has a 57° point and tapered, unsharp (rounded) flutes. The #1 and smaller bits come to a blunt point, but the #2 and above have no point, but rather a nearly squared-off tip, making each size incompatible with the other.

The design is often criticized for its tendency to cam out at lower torque levels than other "cross head" designs, an effect caused by the tapered profile of the flutes which makes them easier to insert into the screw than other similar styles. There has long been a popular belief that this was actually a deliberate feature of the design. Evidence is lacking for this specific narrative and the feature is not mentioned in the original patents. However, a subsequent refinement to the original design described in US Patent #2,474,994 describes this feature.

=== Robertson ===
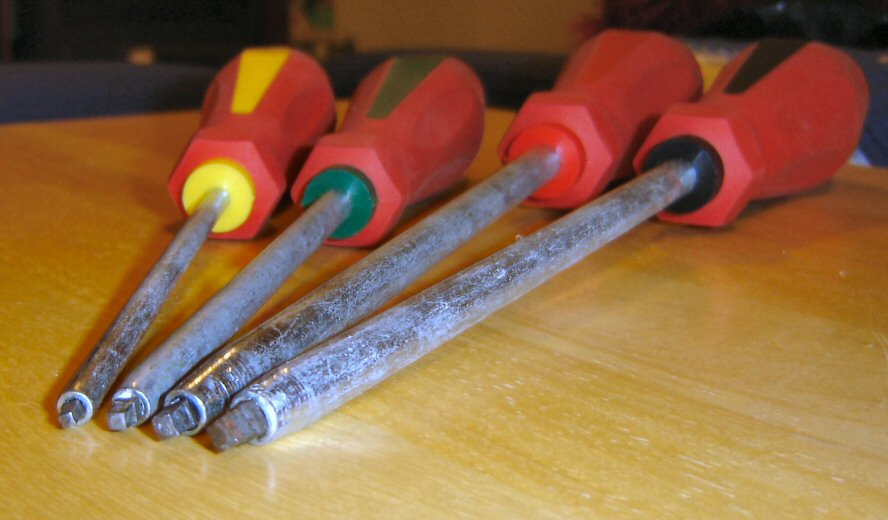
A variety of Robertson sizes

Robertson, also known as a square, or Scrulox screw drive has a square-shaped socket in the screw head and a square protrusion on the tool. Both the tool and the socket have a taper, which makes inserting the tool easier, and also tends to help keep the screw on the tool tip. (The taper's earliest reason for being was to make the manufacture of the screws practical using cold forming of the heads, but its other advantages helped popularize the drive.) Robertson screws are commonplace in Canada, though they have been used elsewhere, and have become much more common in other countries in recent decades. Robertson screwdrivers are easy to use one-handed, because the tapered socket tends to retain the screw, even if it is shaken. They also allow for the use of angled screw drivers and trim head screws. The socket-headed Robertson screws are self-centering, reduce cam-out, stop a power tool when set, and can be removed if painted over or old and rusty. In industry, they speed up production and reduce product damage. One of their first major industrial uses was the Ford Motor Company's Model A & Model T production. Henry Ford found them highly reliable and saved considerable production time, but he could not secure licensing for them in the United States, so he limited their use solely to his Canadian division. Robertson-head screwdrivers are available in a standard range of tip sizes, from 1.77mm to 4.85mm.

=== Reed and Prince ===
Comparison of Phillips and Frearson screw heads

Reed and Prince, also called Frearson, is another historic cross-head screw configuration. The cross in the screw head is sharper and less rounded than a Phillips, and the bit has 45° flukes and a sharper, pointed end. Also, the Phillips screw slot is not as deep as the Reed and Prince slot. In theory, different size R&P screws fit any R&P bit size.

=== Pozidriv ===
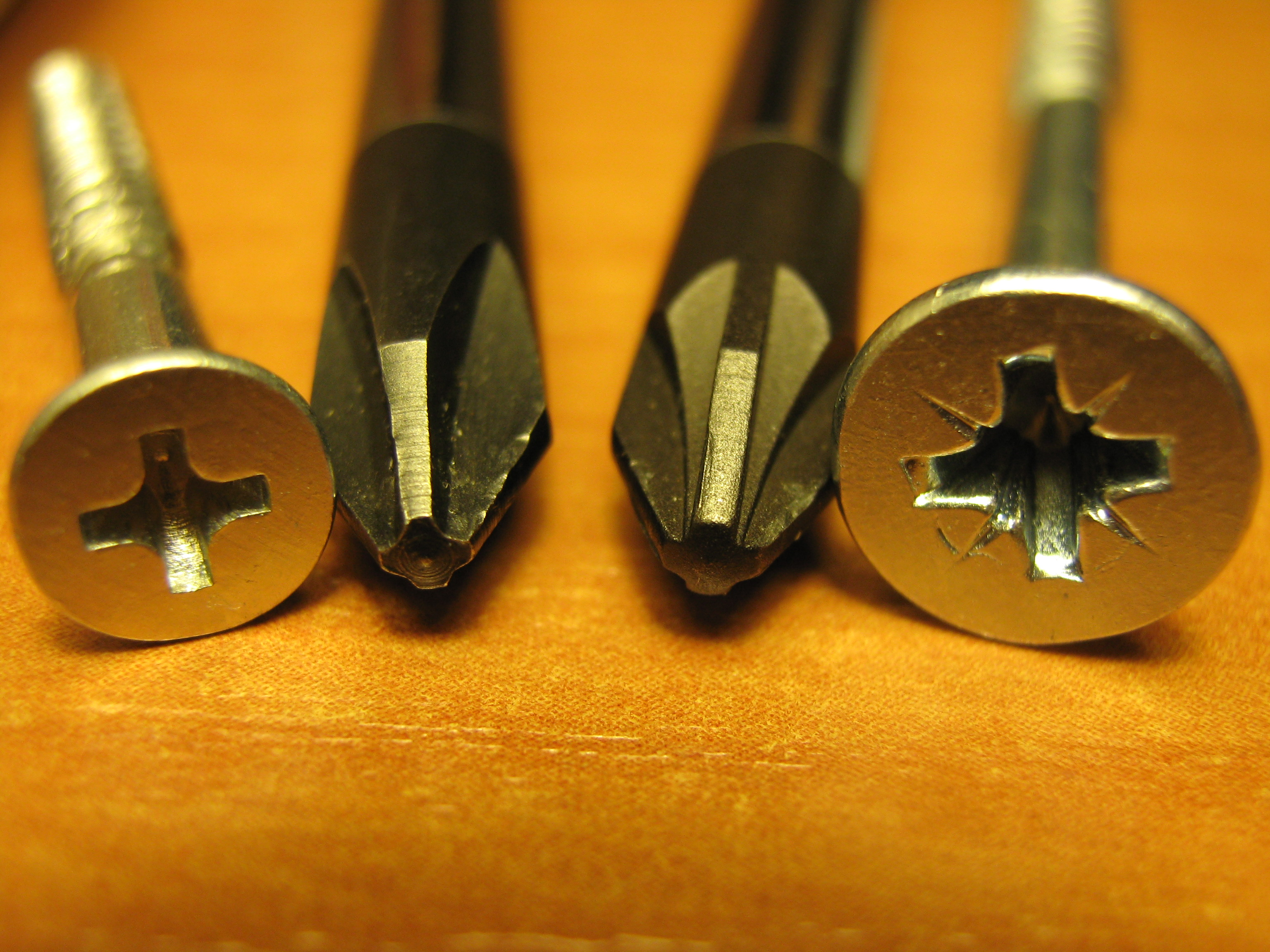
Phillips and Pozidriv compared

Pozidriv and the related Supadriv are widely used in Europe and most of the Far East. While Pozidriv screws have cross heads like Phillips and are sometimes thought effectively the same, the Pozidriv design allows higher torque application than Phillips. It is often claimed that they can apply more torque than any of the other commonly used cross-head screwdriver systems, due to a complex fluting (mating) configuration.

=== Japanese Industrial Standard (JIS) ===
Japanese Industrial Standard (JIS) cross-head screwdrivers are still another standard, often inaccurately called Japanese Phillips. Compatible screw heads are usually identifiable by a single depressed dot or an "X" to one side of the cross slot. This is a screw standard throughout the Asia market and Japanese imports. The driver has a 57° point with a flat tip.

=== Other types ===
A set of "secure" or otherwise less common screwdriver bits, including secure Torx and secure hex or "Allen" variants

Modern electrical appliances often use screws with heads other than the typical slotted or Phillips styles. Torx is one such pattern that has become widespread. It is a spline tip with a corresponding recess in the screw head. The main cause of this trend is manufacturing efficiency: Torx screwdriver tips do not slip out of the fastener as easily as would a Phillips or slotted driver.

Non-typical fasteners are commonplace in consumer devices for their ability to make disassembly more difficult. In microwave ovens, such screws deny casual access to the high-power kilovolt electrical components.

Torx and other drivers have become widely available to the consumer due to their increasing use in the industry. Some other styles fit a three-pointed star recess, and a five-lobed spline with rounded edges instead of the square edges of the Torx. This is called a Pentalobe.

Specialized patterns of security screws are also used, such as the Line Head (LH) style by OSG System Products, Japan, as used in many Nintendo consoles, though drivers for the more common security heads are, again, readily available. Another type of security head has smooth curved surfaces instead of the slot edges that would permit loosening the screw; it is found in public rest room privacy partitions, and cannot be removed by conventional screwdrivers.

== Variations ==
=== Torque screwdrivers ===
Special manual, electric, and pneumatic screwdrivers are available with a clutch that slips at a preset torque. This helps the user tighten screws to a specified torque without damage or over-tightening. Cordless drills designed to use as screwdrivers often have such a clutch.

=== Powered screwdrivers ===
How to use a cordless drill as a powered screwdriver

Interchangeable bits allow the use of powered screwdrivers, commonly using an electric or air motor to rotate the bit. Cordless drills with speed and torque control are commonly used as power screwdrivers.

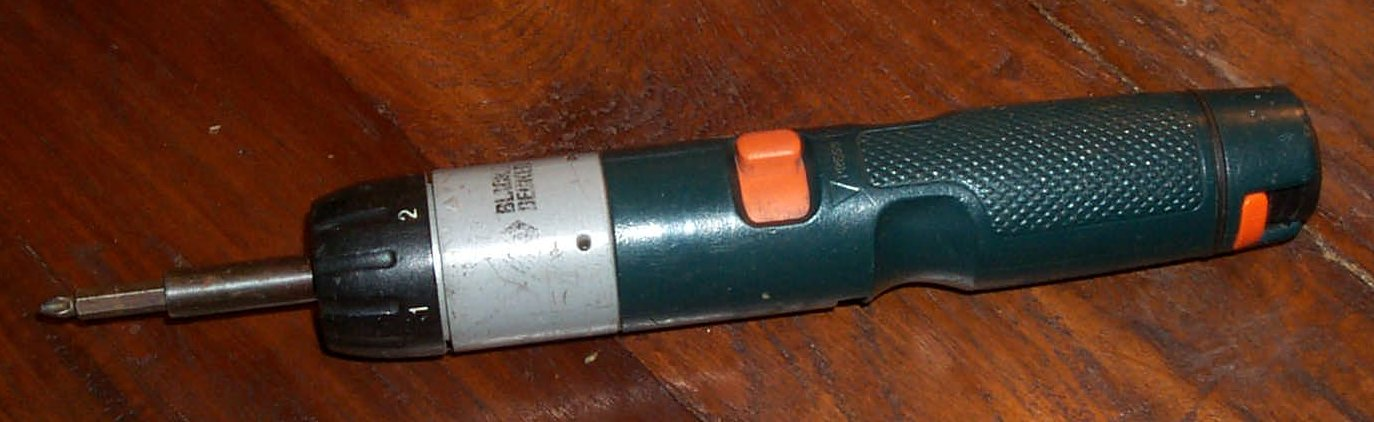
A rechargeable battery-powered electric screwdriver

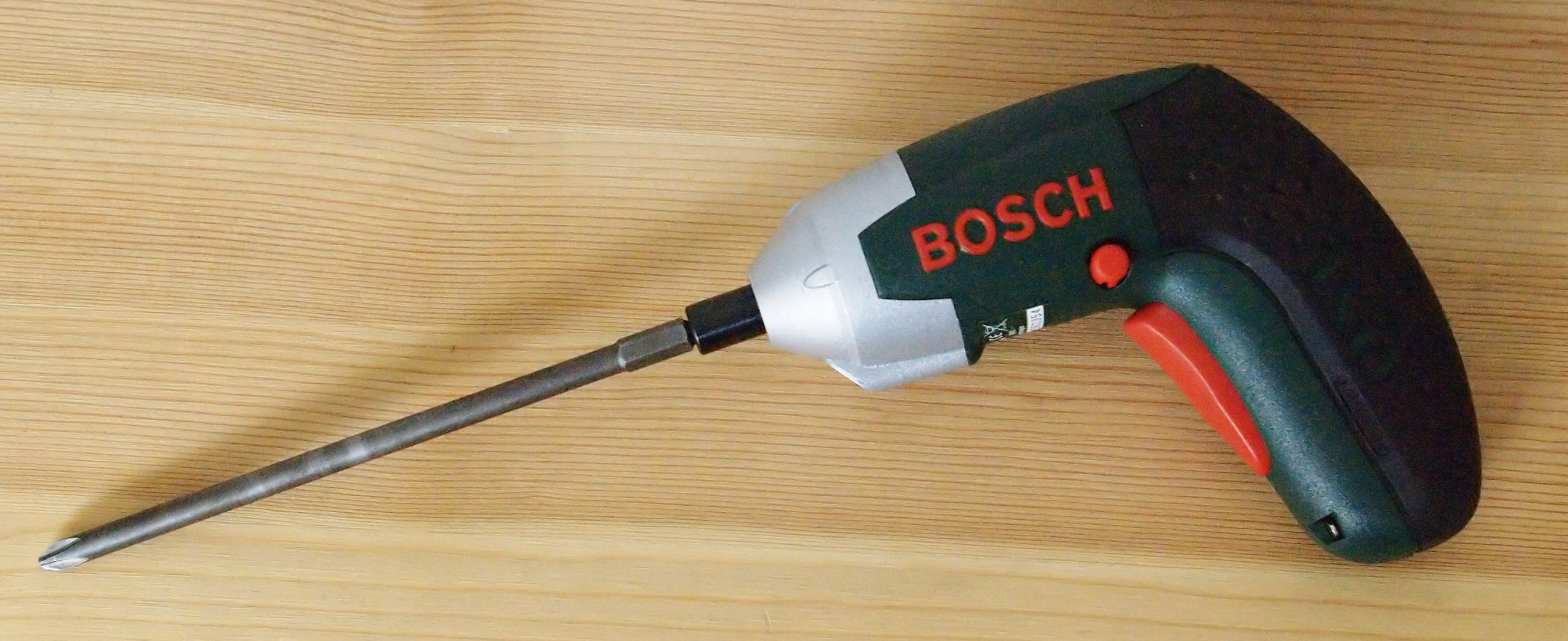
Compact electric screwdriver with extended bit

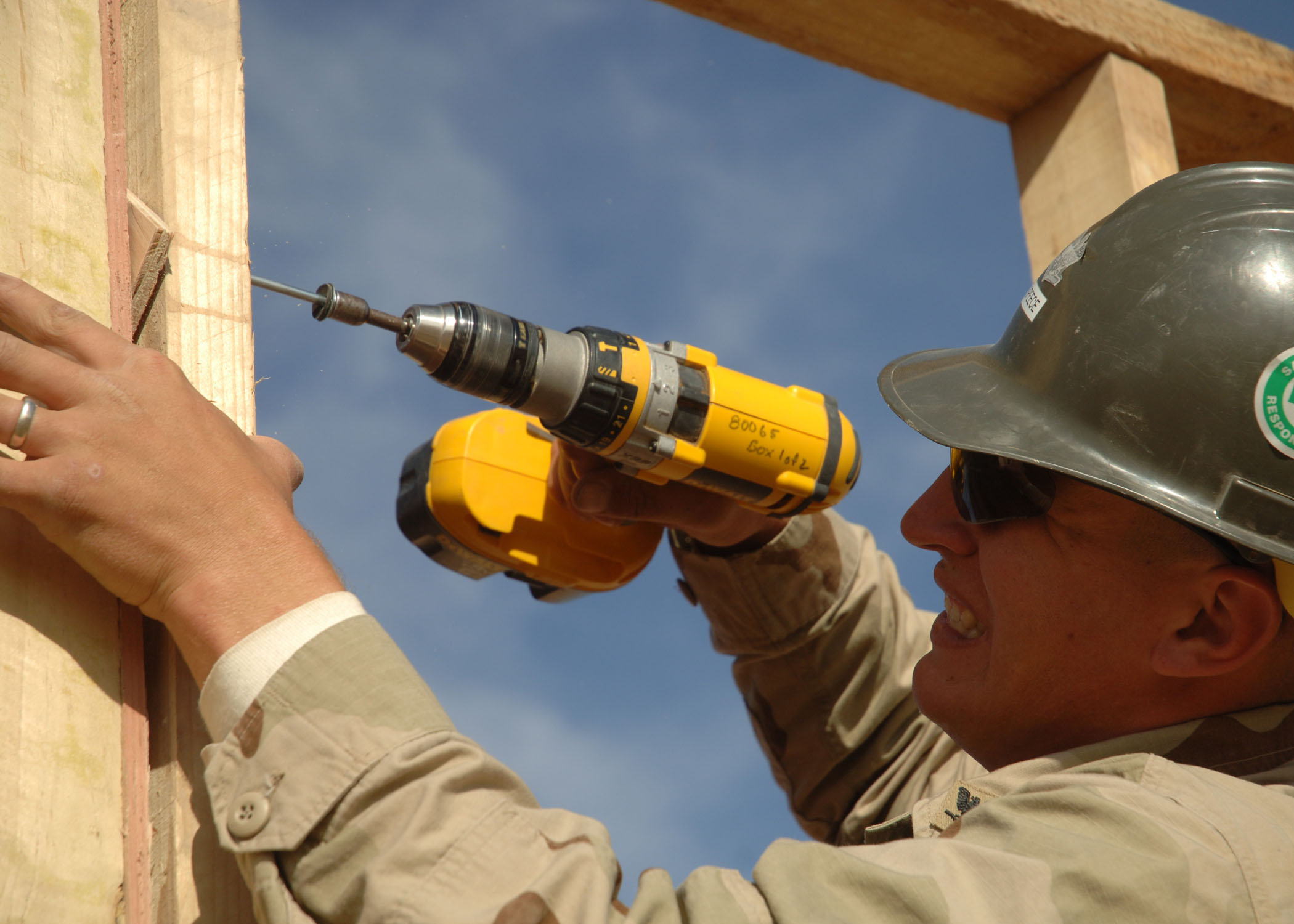
Cordless drill being used to drive screw fastener

=== Ratcheting screwdrivers ===
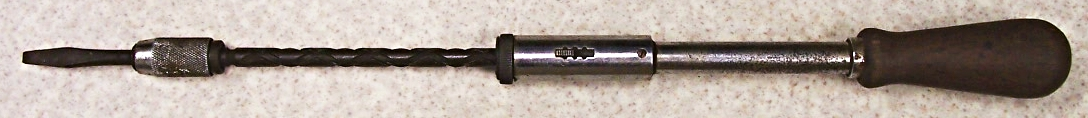
Stanley Yankee No 130A, spiral or ratchet screwdriver

Some manual screwdrivers have a ratchet action whereby the screwdriver blade locks to the handle for clockwise rotation, but uncouples for counterclockwise rotation when set for tightening screws—and vice versa for loosening.

Spiral ratchet screw drivers, often colloquially called Yankee screwdrivers (a brand name), provide a special mechanism that transforms linear motion into rotational motion. Originally the "Yankee" name was used on all tools sold by the North Brothers Manufacturing Company but later, after Stanley purchased the company, it became synonymous with only this type of screwdriver. The user pushes the handle toward the workpiece, causing a pawl in a spiral groove to rotate the shank and the removable bit. The ratchet can be set to rotate left or right with each push, or can be locked so that the tool can be used like a conventional screwdriver. One disadvantage of this design is that if the bit slips out of the screw, the resultant sudden extension of the spring may cause the bit to scratch or otherwise damage the workpiece.

Once very popular, versions of these spiral ratchet drivers using proprietary bits have been largely discontinued by manufacturers such as Stanley. Some companies now offer a modernized version that uses standard 1/4-inch hex shank power tool bits. Since a wide variety of drill bits are available in this format, the tool can do double duty as a "push drill" or Persian drill.

== See also ==
- List of screw drives
- Wheel and axle
