= North Brothers Manufacturing Company =

American manufacturer

- Industry: Manufacturing
- Founded: 1878
- Founder: Selden Gladwin North
- Defunct: 1946
- Fate: Acquired
- Successor: Stanley Works
- Headquarters: Philadelphia, Pennsylvania, United States
- Key people: Selden Gladwin North, Ralph H. North, Frank H. North, John Spring North
- Products: Ice cream freezers, ice shaving and crushing tools, kitchen appliances, various other consumer goods and hand tools.

The North Brothers Manufacturing Company (North Bros. Mfg. Co. or more simply North Bros.) was an American manufacturer based in Philadelphia, Pennsylvania that specialized in the making of hand tools, small appliances and some specialized power tools. They were family owned and operated for over 60 years before being acquired by the Stanley Works in 1946.

They are probably most well known for their line of tools, particularly the "Yankee" brand of ratcheting screwdrivers.

== History ==
Founded in 1878 the company was originally only a foundry operation solely owned by Selden Gladwin North. In 1880 Selden was joined by his brother Ralph H. North and the company become North Bros. Frank H. North became the third brother to join the company in 1886. By 1887 the company had broadened its operations and was incorporated as the North Bros. Mfg. Co. In 1892 the American Machine Co. of Philadelphia and its "Crown" consumer brand was acquired and operations were soon moved to its facilities. In 1893 they acquired the Shepard Hdw. Co. of Buffalo, New York. Next, in 1897, they acquired the Forest City Screwdriver and Drill Company of Portland, Maine and its prolific designer Zachary T. Furbish. In 1919 the son of Ralph North, John Spring North, joined the company. By 1900 the company was a major manufacturer and employer in the city of Philadelphia and produced ice cream freezers, ice shaving and crushing tools, kitchen appliances, various other consumer goods and some hand tools.

As the 20th century progressed they began to focus on hand tools and eventually become a sizeable player in the hand tool industry. Originally focusing on spiral ratchet and "plain" screwdrivers they soon expanded to various types of hand tools and eventually became a significant force in the tool industry. Eventually the success of the Yankee line of tools led the Stanley Works tool company to acquire the North Bros. in 1946, chiefly to improve their own product lines. Stanley was primarily interested in their bit and brace designs, which continued to be produced unchanged at Stanley for decades, and the spiral ratchet "Yankee" screwdrivers. The North Bros. name lived on at Stanley into the 1950s before finally being phased out. The Yankee name continued to be used by Stanley up until the early 2000s before they sold it to the Schroeder tool company. As of 2013 Schroeder of Germany continues to sell "Yankee" branded screwdrivers and push drills.

== Yankee tools ==
North Bros. key acquisition was the hiring of Zachary Furbish when it purchased the Forest City Screwdriver Co in 1897. He brought with him patents related to a spiral ratchet screw driver and considerable experience in tool design. This was their foothold into the tool manufacturing industry which would later become the core of their business. Furbish alone would eventually amass 30 patents related to hand tools produced by North Bros., despite dying in 1906, and his designs would become the backbone of their product lines for years to come.

North Bros. tool brand was called Yankee, much as Sears tools are branded Craftsman, and every tool they sold sported this trademark. In later years the Yankee name would become synonymous with the spiral ratchet screw driver invented by Furbish but it was originally seen on everything from bench vises to cutting tools. Building upon the line of tools originally made by Forest City, North Bros. soon expanded their selection of offerings. Screwdrivers were joined by push drills, breast drills, hand drills (also called egg beater drills), hand powered bench drills, bit and braces, ratcheting tap wrenches, vises, cutting tools and small tool kits.

== See also ==
- List of defunct consumer brands
