= P. L. Robertson =

Canadian inventor, industrialist, salesman, and philanthropist

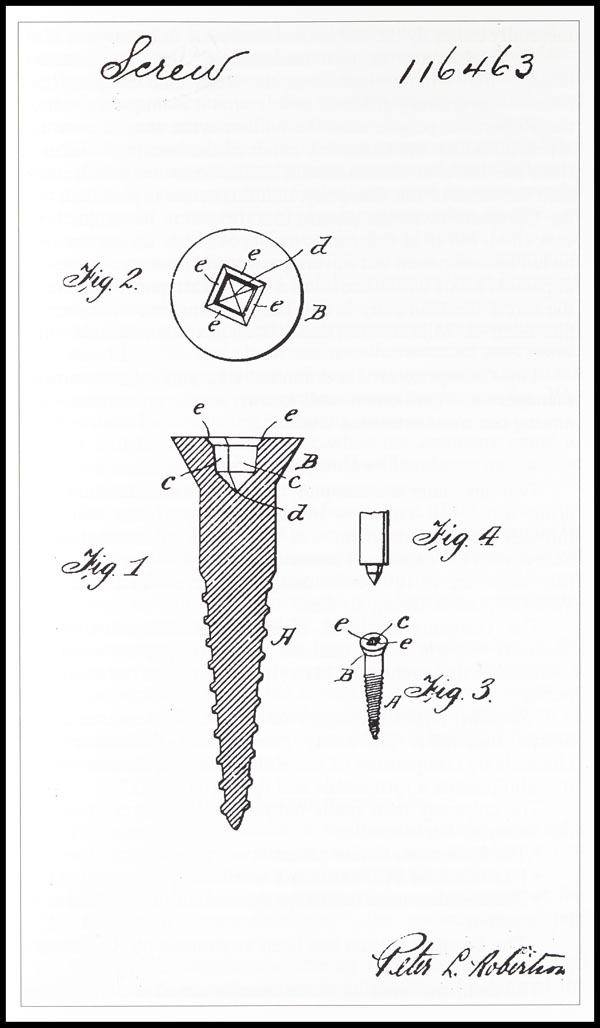
Illustration from the 1909 Canadian patent for the Robertson screw.

Peter Lymburner Robertson (December 10, 1879 – September 28, 1951) was a Canadian inventor, industrialist, salesman, and philanthropist who popularized the square-socket drive for screws, often called the Robertson drive. Although a square-socket drive had been conceived decades before (having been patented in 1875 by Allan Cummings of New York City, U.S. patent 161,390), it had never been developed into a commercial success because the design was difficult to manufacture. Robertson's efficient manufacturing technique using cold forming for the screw's head is what made the idea a commercial success.

== Early life ==
Robertson was born in 1879 in Seneca Township, Ontario, part of the historic Haldimand County, as one of six children to parents John and Annie (née Brown) Robertson, both of Scottish heritage. His father left the family to pursue the Gold Rush at the time, and died in 1886.

Robertson's second cousin and adopted brother, Gordon MacKenzie, described in an interview with the Canadian Workshop magazine that Robertson was "always working on inventions", and would build models while living at his family farm.

== Invention of the Robertson Screwnail ==
As a travelling salesman for a Philadelphia tool company, the North Brothers of Philadelphia, in eastern Canadian sales territories, he was demonstrating tools one day when his straight-bladed screwdriver slipped and cut his hand due to the straight slot design. This incident prompted Robertson to design a different drive for screws that would slip less, leading to his square-socket drive. He received his patent for the screw in 1909.

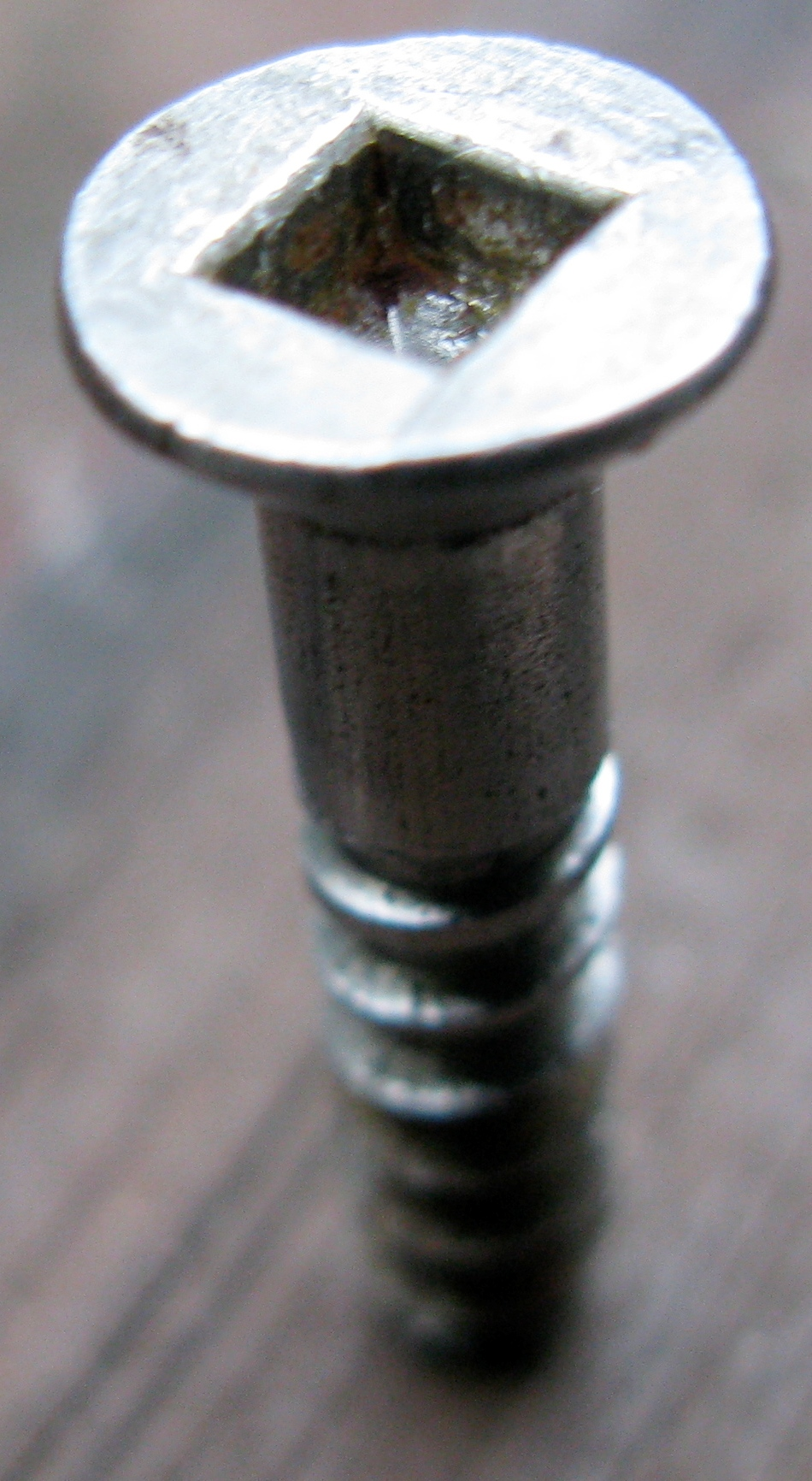
Up-close image of the Robertson screw.

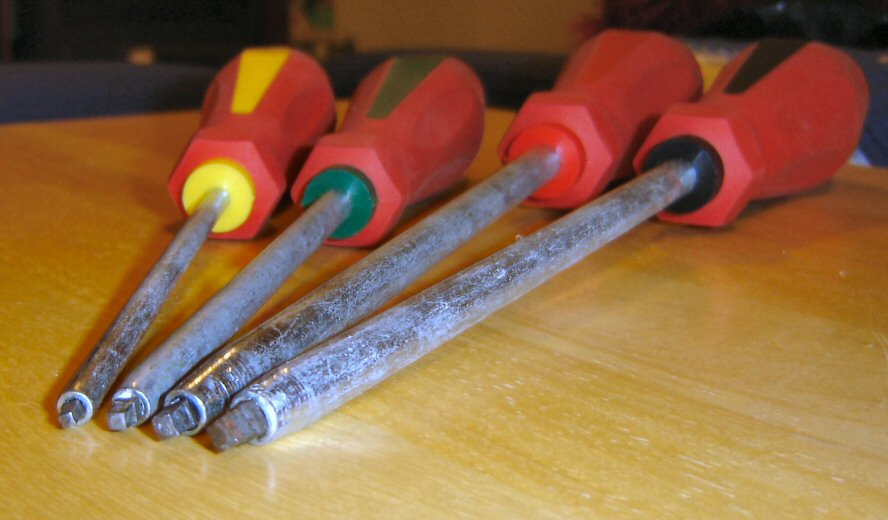
Up-close image of the Robertson square-head screwdrivers.

He had originally established his company, the P.L. Robertson Manufacturing Company, in Hamilton, Ontario in 1907. Robertson then relocated the company to produce his screws in Milton, Ontario, the following year after the town had given a $10,000 loan for the factory's local establishment. The new location also provided incentives to Robertson's factory such as direct roads to the plant, reduced water rates, a sewage disposal system, and a railway siding. During the height of production, the factory had employed over 600 workers.

The brand has been sold over the years, and the manufacturing for the present corporation (Robertson Inc.) is done in Jiaxing, Zhejiang, China; but the Milton, Ontario, building was still a head office for a long time before moving to nearby Burlington, Ontario.

The Fisher Body company, which made the car bodies for the Ford Motor Company, was one of Robertson's first customers and used over 700 Robertson screws in its Model T car. Henry Ford, after finding that the screw saved him about 2 hours of work for each car, attempted to get an exclusive licence for the use and manufacture of the Robertson screw in the US. He was turned down by Robertson who felt it was not in his best interest and shortly after that, Ford found that Henry F. Phillips had invented another kind of socket screw and had no such reservations. Although the Robertson screw is most popular in Canada, it is used extensively in boat building because it tends not to slip and damage material, it can be used with one hand, and it is much easier to remove/replace after weathering.

== Investments ==
Robertson also wrote a book, The Remedy in 1932, where his writing suggested a strategy to end the Great Depression. It discussed topics including national debts, currencies, and the gold standard. Robertson was interested in the value of gold, where by the 1950s, he had invested in gold mining companies, owning more than 70,000 shares across eight companies.

== Personal life ==
Robertson had a daughter with his housekeeper, Margaret, whose identity was kept private from the public.

By 1946, Robertson's health declined due to a combination of his long-time alcoholism and untreated diabetes. He declined insulin treatment despite concern from his family. By October 1946, Robertson was admitted as a patient at The Homewood Sanitarium in Guelph, describing his condition in letters to friends overseas as being "many foul diseases, including diabetes, blindness, and many others."

Robertson died September 28, 1951, having a small funeral at his adopted brother's home. He was buried at Evergreen Cemetery.

== Legacy ==
In 1986, the Milton Historical Society and the Robertson Whitehouse had collaborated to set up two plaques in a ceremony honouring Robertson, one at the original plant building location and one near Robertson's former residence. The markers respectively described Robertson's manufacturing career and the home Robertson lived in for 35 years.

In 2001, Robertson was inducted into the Canadian Hardware and Housewares Manufacturers Association Industry Hall of Fame. He was later inducted into the Canadian Manufacturing Hall of Fame (CMHOF) in 2008.

Robertson was inducted into Milton's Walk of Fame in 2007. The town also has an elementary school named after Robertson that opened in 2009.

In 2002, the documentary Ode to the Robertson Screwdriver aired on the History Television's Turning Point series, describing Robertson's life and his career involving the invention of the eponymous screw.

== Bibliography ==
- Lamb, Ken (1998), P.L.: Inventor of the Robertson Screw, Milton, Ontario, Canada: Milton Historical Society, ISBN 978-0-9695629-6-2, LCCN 00361323, OCLC 39913140, archived from the original on May 4, 2008.
- Robertson, Peter L. (1932), [The remedy]: World reorganization or downfall, and the remedy; a composite picture of the causes of the present disequilibrium in the world—analyzing the extent of war costs, losses, debts, reparations, gold shortage and of the resulting chaos, but with a plan for the redistribution of gold, revaluation of gold, immediate liquidation of debts, a full covering of currencies, and an international coinage, Milton, Ontario, Canada: Author, LCCN 32020618, OCLC 4735733. [Robertson self-published his book, hiring Davis-Lisson Ltd for the printing.]
- Rybczynski, Witold (2000). One Good Turn: A Natural History of the Screwdriver and the Screw. Scribner. ISBN 978-0-684-86729-8. LCCN 00036988.
