= Yankee screwdriver =

Brand of ratcheting screwdriver

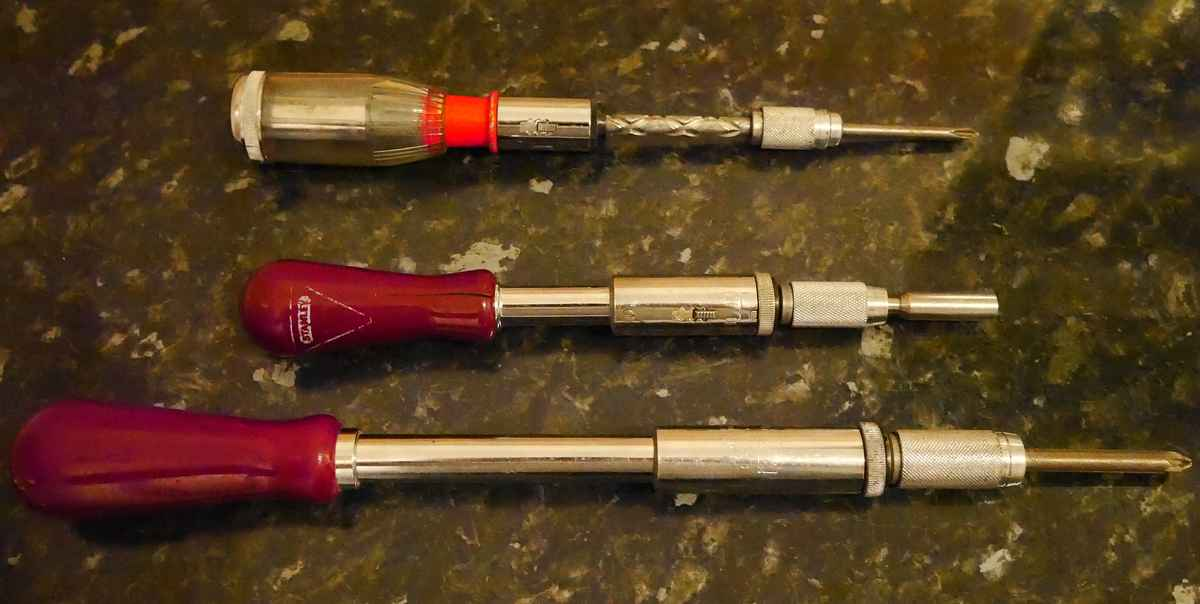
Stanley 130B, 135B and Handyman 233H

A Yankee screwdriver is a specialized tool that combines a ratchet and a screwdriver. The term "Yankee screwdriver" is a generic trademark and these devices are also known as spiral ratchet screwdrivers. It was first marketed by North Brothers Manufacturing Company in 1895, but has been owned by Stanley Tools since the 1940s.

All spiral ratchet screwdriver models made by Stanley did have the Yankee trade name on them, or at least until the 1960s when the Handyman trade name became as well known as the Yankee trade name. Stanley Tools marked certain models with both the Handyman and Yankee brand name on them, and usually the Stanley name was on them as well. The Handyman trade name was not limited to a line of screwdriver models, as the same name was marked on a complete line of planes, drills and other tools specifically marketed to the home user.

== Sizes ==
There were 3 different size spring chucks, and therefore 3 different shank size tips or sometimes called points, to fit various models. Generally all tips made by North Brothers or Stanley were stamped with the corresponding number of the model screwdriver they would fit, but the stamped numbers are often difficult to see, so it's a good idea to know the size you need before you set out to find tips for your screwdriver.

- The smallest size was the number 35, so any of the model numbers with 35 in the number, like No. 135A is the smallest tip shank diameter, measuring 7/32" (5.5mm) diameter shank. (Note that all the handyman models with 33 in their model number also have the No. 35 size chucks, the smallest size tips).
- The middle size is the No. 30 size, and all numbers with the 30 in them have a chuck shank size of 9/32" (7mm) diameter.
- The biggest size is the No. 31, and all numbers with 31 in them have a chuck diameter of 5/16" (8mm) diameter.
- A '1' in front of the number denotes a return spring fitted.

By around 2005 Stanley in the USA had discontinued production of all Yankee tools in previous years. Production did continue in the UK until 2007, when tooling for components of screwdrivers were sent to Japan and have now been scrapped. Over the years other manufacturing companies used similar design chucks, that held Yankee brand screwdriver and drill point tips with the flat and notch on the shank.

== Accessories and bits ==
North Brothers offered several different accessories to fit the various type chucks on the Yankee spiral ratchet screwdrivers. Normally, 3 different slot type tips were included with each screwdriver when it was new. Other tips included:

- Nut drivers in various sizes, both hex and square head
- Drill points for the smallest 133/135 size screwdriver
- adapters to adapt push drill size drill point sets to the three sizes of screwdriver chuck size
- countersinks
- screwdriver tips holding with screw holding feature
- Phillips screwdriver tips in various sizes (Ph#1 to Ph#3 in 5/16" and 9/32" shank models, Ph#1 and Ph#2 sizes only for the 7/32" shank models)
- Stanley UK subsequently introduced Pozidriv screwdriver tips in various sizes (PZ#1 to PZ#3 in 5/16" and 9/32" shank models, PZ#1 and PZ#2 sizes only for the 7/32" shank models)
- slot screwdriver tips with the centring sleeve feature, and
- extra-long screwdriver tips for special applications.

== Other companies ==
The first patented spiral push drill or similar spiral screwdriver dates back to 1868 known as the Allard's patent, but since we have never been able to find one in existence, we assume that the 1868 patent was never manufactured in quantity. The earliest we have observed is the F. A. Howard patent, known to have sold in the US in quantity. The beginning of production of the Howard screwdriver seems to have been in the early 1870s. Most of the first models patented are rare and hard to find. Although North Brothers was not the very first to patent the spiral type mechanism, they were not far behind in terms of years. Most models were designed and patented post 1900, and companies other than North Brothers joined in around 1920.

Over the years Millers Falls not only manufactured their own models, but also manufactured spiral screwdrivers for other companies like "Craftsman" and these models usually only slightly different, were marked with the Craftsman brand name.

In the UK, Hollands & Blair of Gillingham, Kent marketed their "Spiralux" brand equivalents of the Yankee 130 and 135 which accept the corresponding Stanley bits.

== Models ==
=== Yankee "A" ===
Generally "A" is the earlier version with the wooden handle, generally they also don't have the white triangular design printed on the handle, Stanley produced early"A"s at several different factories so there may be slight differences in size and fitment of bits, most early "A"s also were marked as to what model of Yankee they are, they are stamped where the slide switch for backwards and forwards is, the early A's were imperial internal measurements and the chucks are very slightly smaller internally. i.e. the 131A takes 5/16" = 0.3125" bits, and the newer 8mm bits are 0.3150".

=== Yankee "B" ===
Generally "B" is the newer version with a plastic handle, although toward the end of the production they fitted wooden handles, the handle should be marked with the Yankee triangle as mentioned above. These generally are not marked with the type of Yankee they are 131b, 130b etc., they would be stamped where the slide switch for backwards and forwards is situated, Later B's were made in the United Kingdom, West Germany, and the last batches were made in Japan, the B's were metric internal measurements and the chucks are very slightly bigger internally, You may also find that the helix has been machined with flats, whereas A's have a more smooth machined finish to its helix.

== Dimensions ==
=== 131 ===
Made before 2002 = 28" (712mm) long Made after 2002 = 26.5" (672mm) long 131A or B takes 5/16" (8mm) diameter bits

=== 130 ===
20" (508mm) long 130A or B takes 9/32" (7mm) diameter bits

=== 135 ===
13.5" (343mm) long 135A or B takes 7/32"(5.5mm) diameter bits

=== 133B & 233B ===
10.35" (263mm) long Both take the same bits as 135 e.g. 7/32"(5.5mm) diameter bits
