= Persian drill =

Hand-operated drill

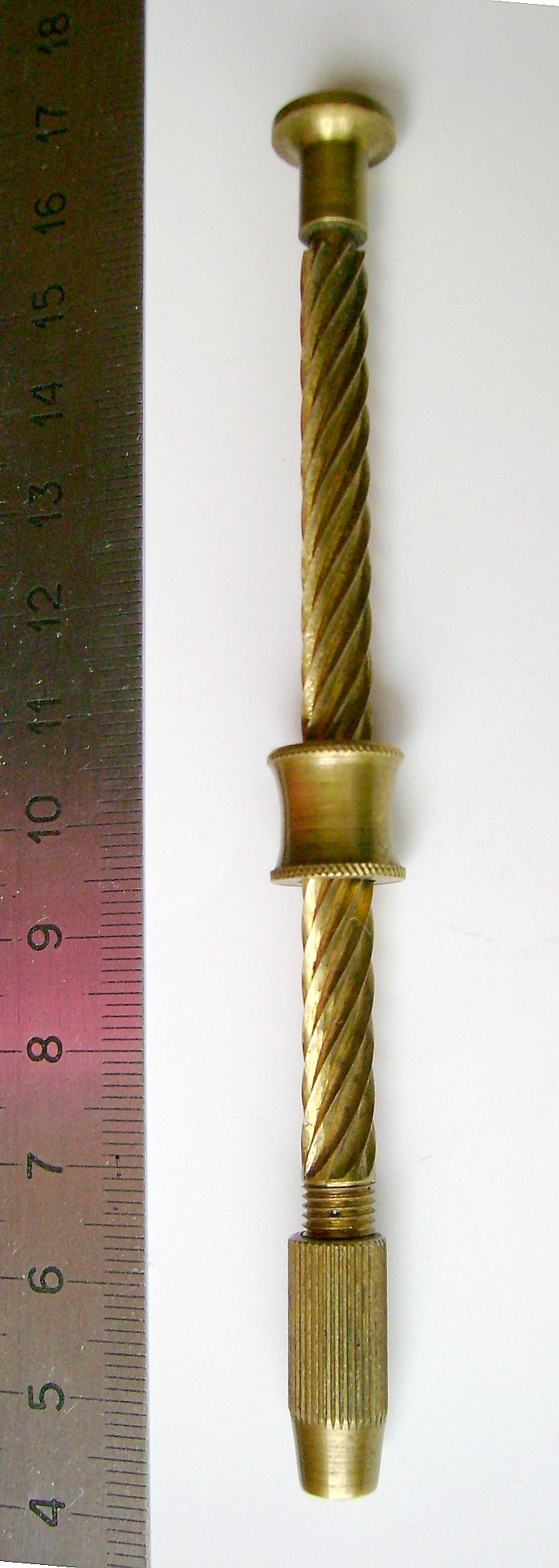

A Persian drill is a drill which is turned by pushing a nut back and forth along a spirally grooved drill holder. It was formerly used for delicate operations such as jewellery making and dentistry. A ratcheting screwdriver with a "spiral ratchet" mechanism may be used as a Persian drill.
