= List of tools and equipment =

This is a list of tools and equipment such as hand tools, power tools, electrician tools, welding and metal work tools, concrete and masonry equipment, plumbing tools, painting tools, measuring tools, heavy equipment, surveying tools, garden tools, and more.

== Hand tools ==
- Adjustable wrench
- Adze
- Allen wrench
- Axe
- Awl
- Ball-peen hammer
- Bark spud
- File
- Froe
- Billhook
- Block plane
- Bolt cutter
- Bow saw
- Brace
- Breaker bar
- Broadaxe
- Burnisher
- Card scraper
- Cat's paw
- Caulk gun
- Ceramic tile cutter
- Chain tool
- Chisel
- Clamps
- Combination square
- Coping saw
- Crowbar
- Cutting torch
- Dado plane
- Dead-blow hammer
- Drift pin
- File
- Fret saw
- Gimlet
- Glass cutter
- Gouge
- Graver
- Grease gun
- Grinding wheel
- Hacksaw
- Hammer
- Hammer stapler
- Hand seamer
- Hand reamer
- Hand scraper
- Hand saw
- Hole punch
- Honing steel
- Hose clamp
- Jack
- Leatherman
- Lug wrench
- Mallet
- Miter box
- Monkey wrench
- Multi-tool
- Nibbler
- Nut driver
- Persian drill
- Pincers
- Pliers
- Pocketknife
- Podger spanner
- Pop-rivet gun
- Pry bar
- Punch
- Punch down tool
- Rasp
- Sandpaper
- Scalpel
- Scissors
- Screwdriver
- Screw extractor
- Scriber
- Sharpening jig
- Sharpening stone
- Shears / snips
- Shovel
- Sledgehammer
- Slide hammer
- Socket wrench
- Speed square
- Spike maul
- Spokeshave
- Square
- Staple gun
- Steel wool
- Surform
- Tap and die
- Tape measure
- Taping knife
- Tire iron
- Tongs
- Tool bit
- Torque wrench
- Tweezers
- Upholstery hammer
- Utility knife
- Vise
- Vise grips
- Wheelbarrow
- Wire cutter
- Wire saw
- Wire stripper
- Wrench
- Woodworking vise
- Workbench
- Yankee screwdriver

== Power tools ==
- Air compressor
- Air hammer
- Alligator shear
- Angle grinder
- Bandsaw
- Belt sander
- Bench grinder
- Bench hook
- Biscuit joiner
- Chainsaw
- Circular saw
- Cold saw
- Concrete grinder
- Concrete saw
- Cordless drill
- Core drill
- Cordless nail gun
- Crusher
- Disc cutter
- Disc sander
- Drill
- Drill press
- Drum sanding / floor sander
- Grinding machine
- Hammer drill
- Heat gun
- Hole saw
- Hydraulic rescue tool
- Hydraulic torque wrench
- Impact driver
- Impact wrench
- Jackhammer
- Jigsaw
- Jointer
- Lathe
- Miter saw
- Nail gun
- Needlegun scaler
- Oscillating multi-tool
- Powder-actuated tool
- Pressure washer
- Radial arm saw
- Reciprocating saw
- Rivet gun
- Rotary hammer
- Rotary saw
- Rotary tool
- Handheld router
- Router table
- Sabre saw
- Sander
- Screw gun
- Scroll saw
- Shear (sheet metal)
- Snow blower
- Steel cut off saw
- Table saw
- Thickness planer
- Wall chaser
- Wood router
- Wood shaper

== Electrician tools and equipment ==
- Cable cutter
- Conduit bender
- Crimping tool
- Digital multimeter
- Electrical tape
- Fish tape
- Insulation resistance tester
- Label maker
- Laser distance meter
- Line tester
- Needle-nose pliers
- Punch-down tool
- Voltage tester
- Wire stripper
- Wire brush
- Wire gauge
- Zip tie

== HVAC tools and equipment ==
- Anemometer
- Bead roller
- Borescope
- Caulking gun
- Crimping tool
- Gas detector
- Hand seamer
- Infrared thermometer
- Manometer
- Multimeter
- Nut driver
- Pipe wrench
- Pliers
- Reamer
- Screwdriver
- Thermometer
- Tin snips
- Tubing cutter
- Vacuum pump
- Voltage tester
- Wire stripper

== Welding and metal work ==
- Angle grinder
- Bending machine
- Bench vise
- Blowtorch
- Broach
- Clamp
- CNC machine
- Cold chisel
- Cutting torch
- Deburring tool
- Die grinder
- Grinding machine
- Hacksaw
- Hand seamer
- Honing steel
- Hose clamp
- Laser cutting
- Oxy–fuel cutting
- Oxy–fuel welding
- Plasma cutting
- Pliers
- Punch
- Rotary tool
- Soldering gun
- Soldering iron
- Tin snips
- Welding helmet
- Welding power supply
- Welding table
- Wire brush
- Wire cutter
- Worklight
- Wire stripper

== Concrete and masonry equipment ==
- Brick hammer
- Block splitter
- Concrete float
- Concrete mixer
- Concrete pump
- Concrete vibrator
- Dry mortar production line
- Formwork
- Hawk (plasterer's tool)
- Lesbian rule
- Power concrete screed
- Power trowel
- Rebar bender
- Screed
- Trowel

== Plumbing tools and equipment ==
- Adjustable wrench
- Basin wrench
- Borescope
- Caulking gun
- Drain snake
- Driving cap
- Pipe cutter
- Pipe wrench
- Plunger
- Plumber wrench
- Propane torch
- Strap wrench
- Thread seal tape
- Tongue-and-groove pliers
- Water metering

== Automotive tools and equipment ==
- Air compressor
- Balancing machine
- Battery charger
- Bleed screw
- Brake tester
- Breaker bar
- Car lift
- Car ramp
- Chassis dynamometer
- Creeper
- Dynamometer
- Engine cart
- Engine crane
- Engine stand
- Feeler gauge
- Funnel
- Grease gun
- Hydraulic jack
- Impact wrench
- Jack
- Leak-down tester
- Lug wrench
- Multimeter
- Oil-filter wrench
- Plastic repair welder
- Pressure gauge
- Pry bar
- Punch
- Ratchet wrench
- Rubber mallet
- Socket wrench
- Scan tool
- Screwdriver
- Slide hammer
- Tire pressure gauge
- Tool chest
- Torque wrench
- Wheel alignment equipment
- Wheel chock
- Wheel washing system
- Worklight
- Wrenches

== Painting tools and equipment ==
- Airbrush
- Drop cloth
- Dust mask
- Heat gun
- Paintbrush
- Paint roller
- Painter's palette
- Painter's tape
- Painting knife
- Putty knife
- Sandpaper
- Spray booth
- Spray paint can
- Spray gun
- Tack cloth
- Wire brush

== Measuring tools ==
- Altimeter
- Angle gauge
- Beam compass
- Caliper
- Carpenter's square
- Clinometer
- Compass
- Depth gauge
- Dial indicator
- Laser distance measurer
- Level
- Measuring wheel
- Micrometer
- Multimeter
- Protractor
- Ruler
- Speed square
- Square
- Stud finder
- Tape measure
- Theodolite
- Vernier scale
- Weighing scale

== Miscellaneous ==
- 3D printer
- Bungee cord
- Carabiner
- Chalk line
- Duct tape
- Extension cord
- Formwork
- Gaffer tape
- Glue stick
- Headlamp
- Hot glue gun
- Small level
- Painter's tape
- Paper cutter
- Pencil sharpener
- Rope
- Safety cone / construction cone
- Scaffolding
- Shop vac
- Shoring equipment
- Step ladder
- Sawhorse
- Tarpaulin
- Tool vest
- Cut-resistant gloves

== Heavy equipment ==
Tractor

- Bulldozer (dozer, track dozer)
- Snowcat
- Snowplow
- Skidder
- Tractor (wheel tractor)
- Track tractor
- Locomotive
- Artillery tractor
- Crawler-transporter
- Military engineering vehicles

Grader

- Grader

Excavator

- Amphibious excavator
- Compact excavator
- Dragline excavator
- Dredger
- Bucket-wheel excavator
- Excavator (digger)
- Long reach excavator
- Power shovel
- Reclaimer
- Suction excavator
- Walking excavator
- Trencher
- Yarder

Backhoe

- Backhoe
- Backhoe loader

Timber

- Feller buncher
- Harvester
- Forwarder
- Logging truck
- Skidder
- Stump grinder
- Power saw
- Track harvester
- Wheel forwarder
- Wheel skidder

Pipelayer

- Pipelayer (sideboom)

Scraper

- Fresno scraper
- Scraper
- Wheel tractor-scraper (belly scraper)

Mining

- Construction and mining tractor
- Construction and mining truck
- Dumper
- Dump truck
- Haul truck
- Mining equipment
- Reclaimer
- Stacker
- Spreader

Articulated

- Articulated hauler

Compactor

- Wheel dozer (soil compactor)
- Soil stabilizer

Loader

- Loader (payloader, front loader, wheel loader, integrated tool carrier)
- Skip loader (skippy)

Track loader

- Track loader

Skid-steer loader

- Skid-steer loader

Material handler

- Aerial work platform, Lift table
- Crane
- Block-setting crane
- Bulk-handling crane
- Crane vessel
- Aerial crane
- Container crane
- Gantry crane
- Overhead crane
- Electric overhead traveling crane
- Ring crane
- Level luffing crane
- Mobile crane
- Travel lift
- Forklift
- Garbage truck
- Grapple truck, Knuckleboom loader (trailer mount)
- Straddle carrier
- Sidelifter
- Reach stacker
- Telescopic handlers
- Tow truck

Paving

- Asphalt paver
- Asphalt plant
- Cold planer
- Cure rig
- Paver
- Pavement milling
- Pneumatic tire compactor
- Roller (road roller, roller compactor)
- Slipform paver
- Vibratory compactor, Compactor

Underground

- Roadheader
- Tunnel boring machine
- Underground mining equipment

Hydromatic tool

- Ballast tamper
- Attachments
- Drilling rig
- Horizontal directional drilling
- Earth auger
- Pile driver
- Post pounder
- Rotary tiller (rototiller, rotovator)

Hydraulic machinery

Highway

- Tractor unit
- Ballast tractor
- Pushback tractor
- Railcar mover
- Highway 10 yard rear dump
- Highway bottom dump (stiff), pup (belly train), triple
- Highway end dump and side dump
- Highway transfer, Transfer train
- Concrete mixer
- Concrete mix truck
- Concrete mix dozer
- Lowboy (trailer)
- Street sweeper
- Street sweep truck
- Street sweep dozer

== Surveying and layout tools ==
- Automatic level
- Bull's eye level
- Laser rangefinder
- Laser level
- Plumb bob
- Surveyor's chain
- Survey marker
- Surveyor's wheel
- Theodolite
- Total station
- Surveying tripod

== Farming tools and equipment ==
- Bale wrapper
- Baler
- Broadfork
- Chaff cutter
- Combine harvester
- Cultivator
- Forage harvester
- Forage wagon
- Grain cart
- Grain hopper trailer
- Gravity wagon
- Harrows
- Hay rake
- Hay tedder
- Hoe
- Irrigation sprinkler
- Machete
- Manure spreader
- Mattock
- Milking machine
- Pitchfork
- Plough
- Rake
- Skid-steer loader
- Scythe
- Seed drill
- Shovel
- Sickle
- Spade
- Sprayer
- Threshing machine
- Tractor
- Two-wheel tractor
- Wheelbarrow

== Temporary site utilities ==
- Air compressor
- Cable reel
- Cofferdam
- Construction trailer
- Dehumidifier
- Generator
- Extension cord
- Floodlight
- Fuel tank
- Gas cylinder
- Fan heater
- Lighting tower
- Temporary fencing
- Bailey bridge
- Water pump
- Water tank

== Garden tools and equipment ==
- Aerator
- Ard (plough)
- Auger
- Averruncator
- Berry-picking rake
- Billhook
- Broadfork
- Broadcast spreader
- Brushcutter
- Coa de jima
- Cultivator
- Daisy grubber
- Dethatcher
- Dibber
- Digging stick
- Earth auger
- Edger
- Garden fork
- Garden hose
- Garden roller
- Grafter
- Grass shears
- Grass stitcher
- Hedge trimmer
- Hoe
- Kirpi
- Lawn aerator
- Lawn mower
- Lawn sweeper
- Leaf blower
- Loppers
- Machete
- Mammoty
- Mattock
- Post hole digger
- Post pounder
- Potting bench
- Pickaxe
- Pitchfork
- Pruning shears
- Rake
- Rhubarb forcer
- Scythe
- Shovel
- Sickle
- Sling blade
- Soil knife
- Spade
- Sprayer
- Sprinkler
- Trowel
- Watering can
- Weed trimmer
- Weeder
- Wheelbarrow
- Woodchipper

== Sewing tools and equipment ==
- Beeswax
- Bodkin
- Bobbin
- Clothes iron
- Cutting mat
- Dress form
- Embroidery hoop
- Heat press
- Hole punch
- Iron
- Ironing board
- Knit picker
- Knitting machine
- Knitting needle
- Knitting needle cap
- Mannequin
- Measuring tape
- Needlecase
- Needle threader
- Pattern notcher
- Patterns
- Pinking shears
- Pin cushion
- Pin
- Pressing cloth
- Rotary cutter
- Ruler
- Scissors
- Seam ripper
- Serger
- Sewing kit
- Sewing gauge
- Sewing machine
- Sewing machine needle
- Sewing needle
- Sewing table
- Silkscreen
- Stitching awl
- Tailor's chalk
- Tailor's ham
- Tape measure
- Thimble
- Thread
- Tracing paper
- Tracing wheel
- Yarn

== Safety and Personal Protective Equipment ==
- Ear protection
- Eye protection
- Dust mask
- Hearing protection devices
- Fall arrest system
- Face shield
- Fire extinguisher
- First aid kit
- Gloves
- Hard hat
- High-visibility clothing
- Knee pads
- Push stick
- Respirator
- Safety glasses
- Safety harness
- Steel-toe boots
- Woodworking apron

== See also ==
- Construction site
- Drill bit and drill bit sizes
- List of building materials
- List of screw drives
- List of timber framing tools
- List of tool manufacturers
- Machine shop
- Woodshop
