= Car lift =

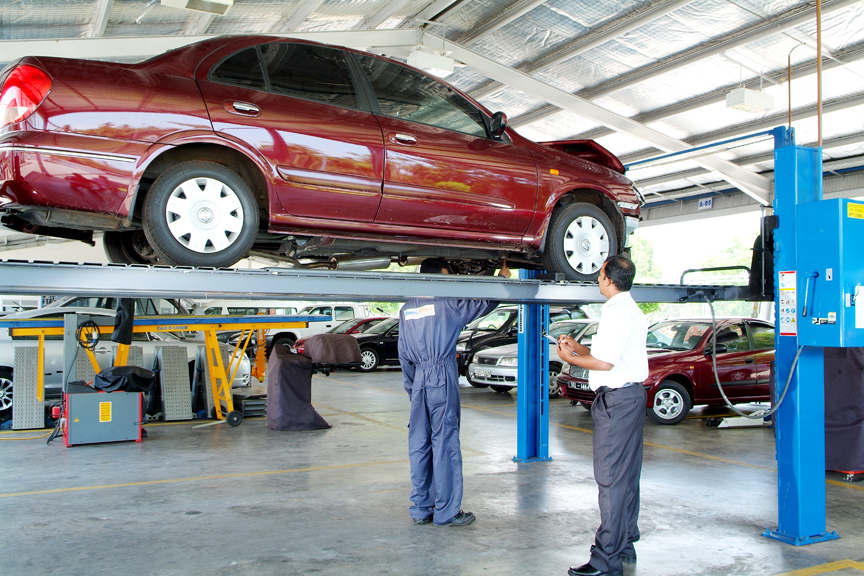
Car lift from the wheels

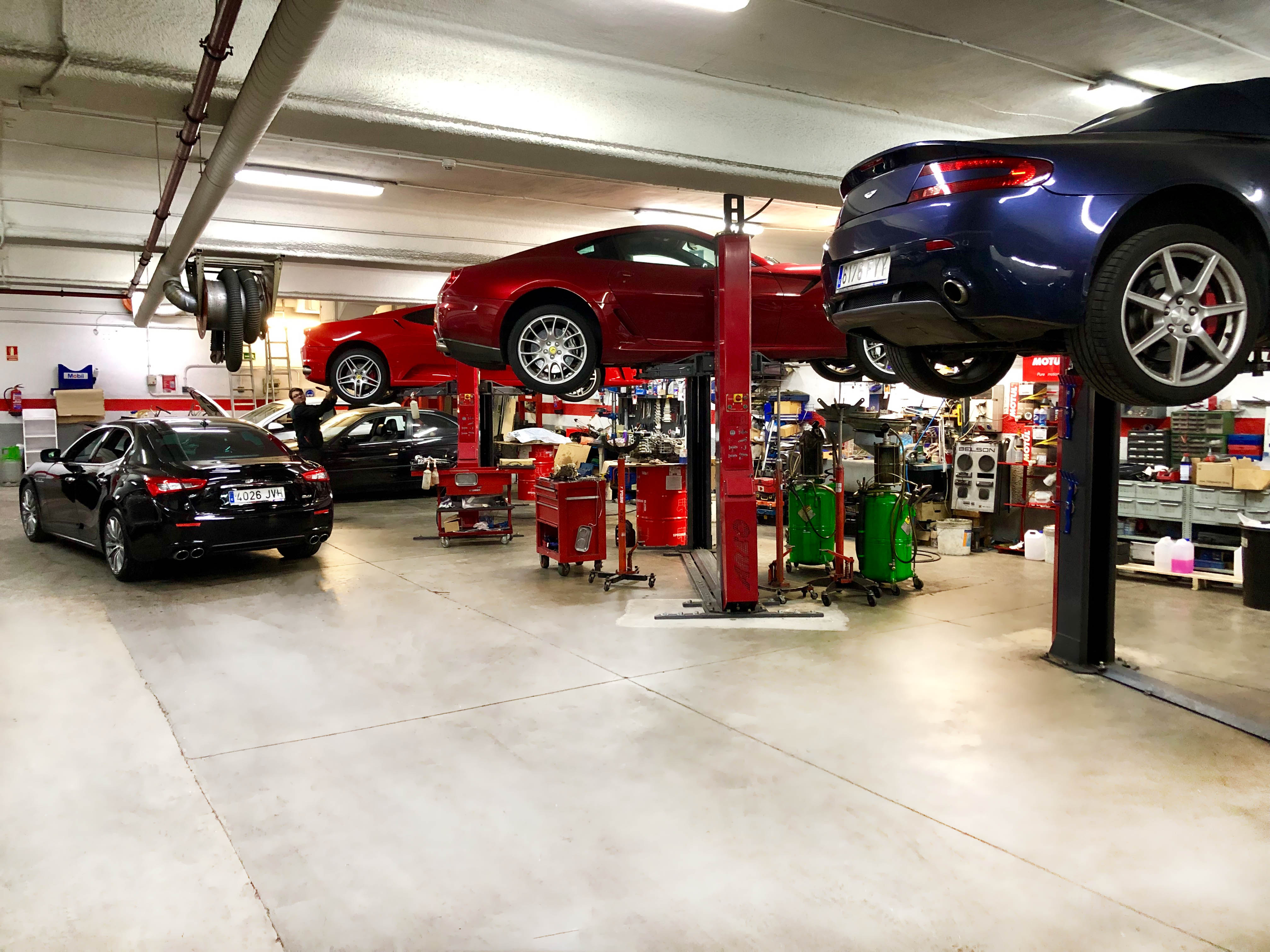
Auto mechanic working under car lifts

Car lift may refer to:

- Car elevator, a device which transports cars between different floors of a building
- Automotive lift, car hydraulic lift, 2 post lift or 2 column lift, a device which mechanically lifts a car up, so that the mechanic can work underneath
- Car ramp, a device which raises a car from the ground for access to its undercarriage

== See also ==
- Autorack
- Car jack
