= Podger =

Podger may refer to:

== People ==
- Andrew Podger (born 1948), Australian public servant
- Julian Podger (born 1966), English tenor singer and member of Gothic Voices
- Rachel Podger (born 1968), English violinist

== Fiction ==
- 'Podger' Pam Jolly, a minor character in the TV drama series Bad Girls
- Uncle Podger, a character in Jerome K. Jerome's Three Men in a Boat
  - My Uncle Podger, a 1975 picture book by Wallace Tripp, reimagining the Jerome character as an anthropomorphic rabbit

== Other uses ==
- Podger spanner, a tool consisting of a tapered bar with a wrench at one end
