= Joyride (crime) =

Theft of a vehicle for pleasure or thrill

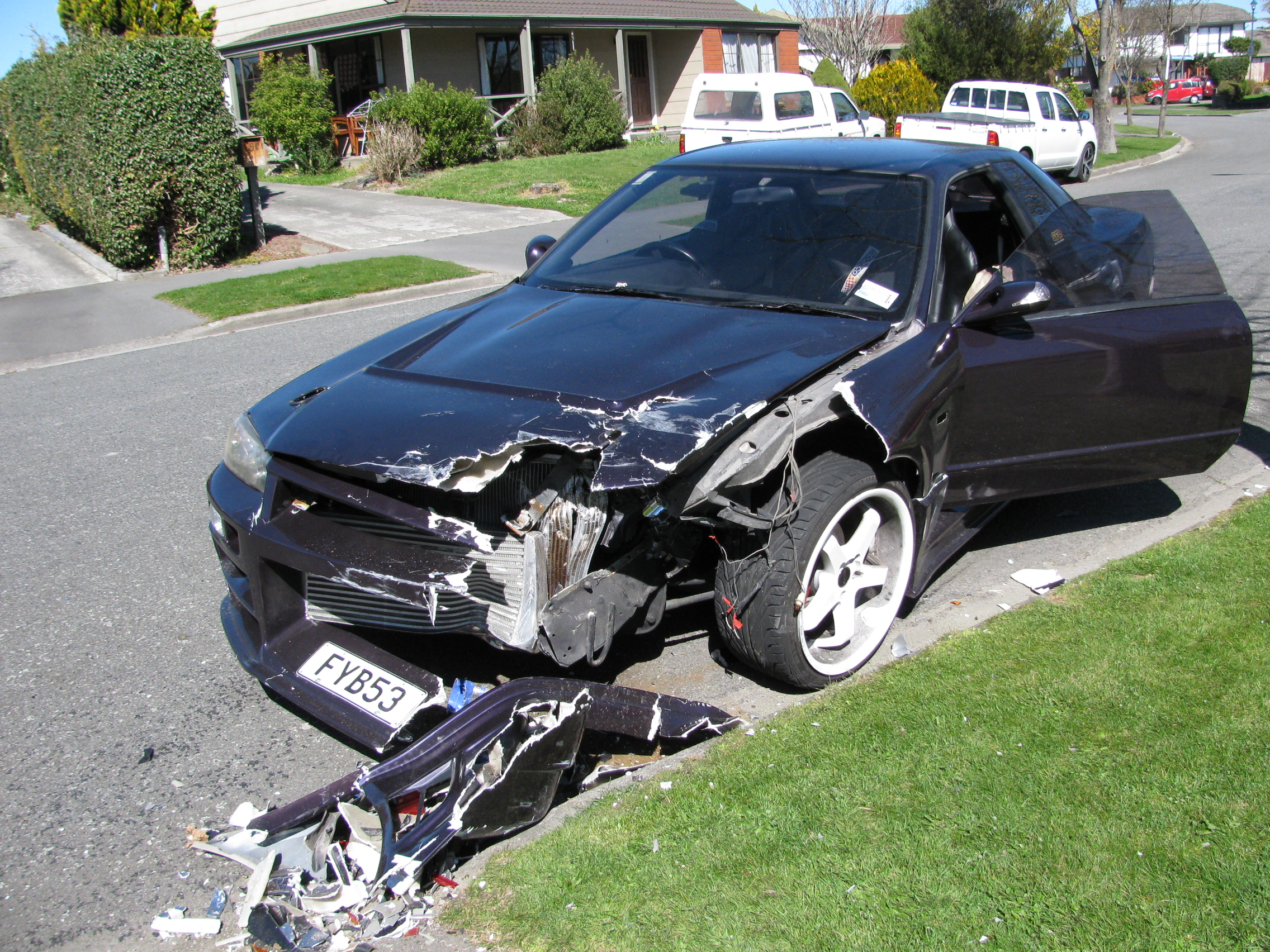
A Nissan Skyline damaged after a joyride by car thieves, in Christchurch, New Zealand

Joyriding is driving or riding in a stolen vehicle, most commonly a car, with no particular goal other than the pleasure or thrill of doing so or to impress other people. The term "joy riding" was coined by a New York judge in 1908.

Joyriders often act opportunistically and choose easy targets (such as cars with keys left by their owners in the ignition or neighbors' cars). Like other car thieves, they can also gain access to locked cars with simple tools; a flathead screwdriver and a slide hammer long sufficed, although modern cars have systems to prevent a screwdriver from opening locks. Locks in cars manufactured before the early to mid-1990s were weak enough that they could easily be opened in this way. Similarly, ignition systems were much less sophisticated before the early to mid-1990s and easier to bypass, allowing would-be joyriders to start a car by either hot-wiring it or breaking its ignition lock. The vehicle is often driven through rural areas or less busy residential areas to avoid police notice, then dumped when it is out of fuel or damaged. Many cases of joyriding end up with the vehicle interior soaked in petrol and lit to avoid forensic identification, or at best sustaining serious damage resulting in expensive repairs or an insurance write-off. Joyriding is most often committed by people accompanied by peers rather than alone.

== Incidence and laws ==
Under English law and other common-law systems, joyriding is not considered to be theft because the intent to "permanently deprive" the vehicle's owner of the vehicle cannot be proven. Instead, joyriding constitutes a separate, statutorily established offense of "unauthorized use" or "taking without owner's consent" (usually known by the acronym TWOC, or the slang terms "twoccing" or "twocking").

In 2007, in the United States and in Australia, most car thefts involved joyriding.

=== United Kingdom ===
Joyriding was a major problem in the United Kingdom during the 1980s and accelerated in the 1990s, but has eased off since the year 2000 largely due to improved security standards on newer cars and the number of old cars with more basic security diminishing. Many surviving older cars have had modern security features fitted in order to reduce the risk of theft.

High performance cars, including Ford's high performance XR and Cosworth models, were a popular choice for car thieves when joyriding in the United Kingdom was its peak, which contributed to a rise in insurance premiums for owners of such vehicles. Many motorists fitted their cars with security features before such equipment became standard on new cars. Since the advent of immobilisers and car alarms, car thieves have frequently mugged motorists or broken into their homes in order to steal the keys to a car.

In 2005, the Home Office conducted a survey to find out the most stolen cars per registered in the UK:

1. Vauxhall Belmont (1986–1991)
2. Vauxhall Astra Mk2 (1984–1991)
3. Ford Escort Mks 3 and 4 (1980–1990)
4. Austin/MG Metro (1980–1990)
5. Vauxhall Nova (1983–1993)
6. Ford Orion (1983–1993)
7. Rover Metro (1990–1994)
8. Austin/MG/Rover Maestro (1983–1994)
9. Austin/MG/Rover Montego (1984–1994)
10. Ford Fiesta Mks1, 2 and 3 (1976–1995)

The lack of security in older cars compared to modern equivalents is reflected in the fact that all of the cars listed had been out of production for at least 10 years, and the oldest examples of most of these cars were at least 20 years old.

In 2009, the Home Office conducted a new survey and found out the most stolen cars (per registered) were as follows:

1. Vauxhall Astra (1980–present)
2. Volkswagen Golf (1974–present)
3. Ford Fiesta (1976–present)
4. Ford Focus (1998–present)
5. Ford Escort (1968–2000)
6. Vauxhall Corsa (1993–present)
7. Ford Mondeo (1993–present)
8. Ford Transit (1964–present)
9. Vauxhall Vectra (1995–2008)
10. Honda Civic (1972–present)

The information released does not show the specific generation of a car, making it difficult to determine how many older examples were stolen in relation to more modern ones. For instance, the Ford Transit nameplate dates back to 1964, and the Ford Fiesta first appeared in 1976. However, the Ford Focus is the only nameplate on the list to have been introduced after 1995, around the time that car security standards became more advanced.

=== United States ===
In the United States, the most stolen cars in 2017 (per registered) were:

1. Honda Civic
2. Honda Accord
3. Ford Pickup Truck (Full Sized)
4. Chevrolet Pickup (Full Sized)
5. Toyota Camry
6. Nissan Altima
7. Toyota Corolla
8. Dodge Pickup (Full Size)
9. GMC Pickup (Full Size)
10. Chevrolet Impala

=== Northern Ireland ===
In Northern Ireland, joyriding is a common crime, and many people have campaigned against it. Since the 1980s, a number of youth gangs have been in existence, particularly in nationalist areas of Belfast, dedicated to joyriding and other criminal activities. During The Troubles, paramilitaries such as the Provisional IRA administered to suspected joyriders extralegal punishment, usually consisting of breaking their fingers or kneecaps, in order to temporarily or permanently incapacitate them from operating most motor vehicles. These punishments are still given today by the Continuity IRA, a breakaway organization from the Provisional IRA.

== See also ==
- Criminal conversion
- Motor vehicle theft
