= Wire stripper =

Tool used to strip electrical insulation from electric wires

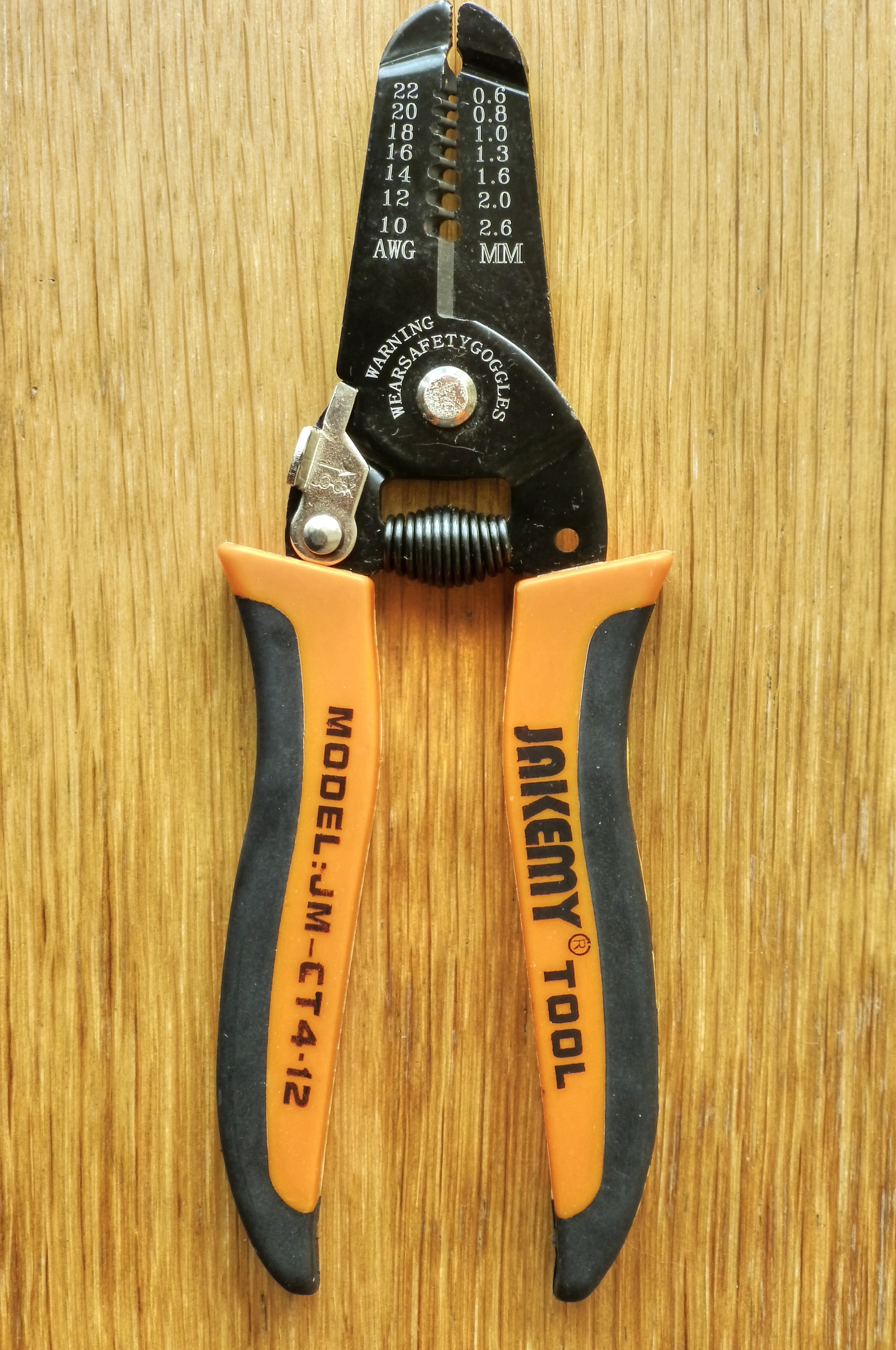
- Wire strippers
- Classification: hand tool
- Related: pliers

A wire stripper is a small, hand-held device used to strip the electrical insulation from electric wires.

== Types ==
=== Manual ===
A simple manual crimping/wire stripper tool is a pair of opposing blades much like scissors or wire cutters. The addition of a center notch makes it easier to cut the insulation without cutting the wire. This type of wire stripper is used by rotating it around the insulation while applying pressure in order to make a cut around the insulation. Since the insulation is not bonded to the wire, it then pulls easily off the end. This type of wire stripper can be used on wires of any size. Another type of manual wire stripper is very similar to the simple design previously mentioned, except this type has several notches of varying size. This allows the user to match the notch size to the wire size, thereby eliminating the need for twisting, but can only be used on wire sizes that approximately match one of the notches. Once the device is clamped on, the remainder of the wire can simply be pulled out, leaving the insulation behind.

European-style wire strippers look more like a notched pincer, with a grab that is adjusted with a screw.

=== Compound automatic ===
The compound automatic wire stripper was first patented in 1915 by Stuart G. Wood of Brooklyn, NY. The design was refined by Herman Gerhard Jan Voogd of the Netherlands eliminating the awkward 4 bar mechanism taking on the general outline that it has kept since. Wood, now of Rockville IL, added reinforcements, replaceable blades, and blade stops in 1943 The 1943 design was also equipped to block the halves open after stripping to avoid crushing the freshly stripped wire as it returned to its rest position. A second actuation released the mechanism to return to the rest position. The action was further refined by Wood and finally, in 1959, by Eugene D. Hindenburg of DeKalb, IL. The 1959 refinement of the action shifted the sequence of operations so that the stripping blades opened before any other part of the mechanism began to return to the rest position while the clamping jaws retraced the sequence of operation, remaining closed until the handles were fully released.

When engaged, a compound automatic wire stripper first simultaneously grips the wire in one side and in the other side closes its shaped blades cutting the insulation around the conductor. After the sides have completed their strokes the two sides of the mechanism spread apart to push the cut tube of insulation from the end of the conductor. To use it, one simply places the wire in the jaws at the cutting slot matching the size of the conductor and squeezes the handles together. This device allows even a novice to strip most wires very quickly. The compound automatic wire stripper's cutter must be short, because it causes the jaws to twist, as described by Wood in the 1943 patent. All wire strippers are inherently limited to those wire sizes the cutting jaw notches will accommodate. A compound automatic wire stripper's short cutter limits it to fewer notches and a smaller range of wire sizes than most other types of wire strippers. The accuracy of the cutting blade opening determines the smallest conductor that can be reliably stripped. If the cutter opening is too small it will impinge on the conductor causing excess friction and more tension than the wire can withstand. If the cutter opening is too large the tension required to tear the remaining annulus of uncut insulation may be greater than the wire can withstand. Some models have an adjustable grip tension, to adjust the clamping force of the gripping jaw. The knob below the jaw on the yellow automatic strippers in the image below is a grip tension adjustment. Although in principle applicable to wire of any size, compound automatic wire strippers that are widely available have cutters that can accommodate conductors in a range of sizes no larger than 8 AWG nor smaller than 26 AWG, but not the entire range.

=== Laser wire stripper ===
A laser wire stripper is a computer-controlled machine, much like a CNC router, which uses a laser to burn off the insulation of the wire. Laser wire stripping machines are used mostly for very fine gauge wires since they do not damage the conductor. A typical CO_{2} laser wire stripping machine should be capable of stripping the insulation from any size wire.

== Gallery ==
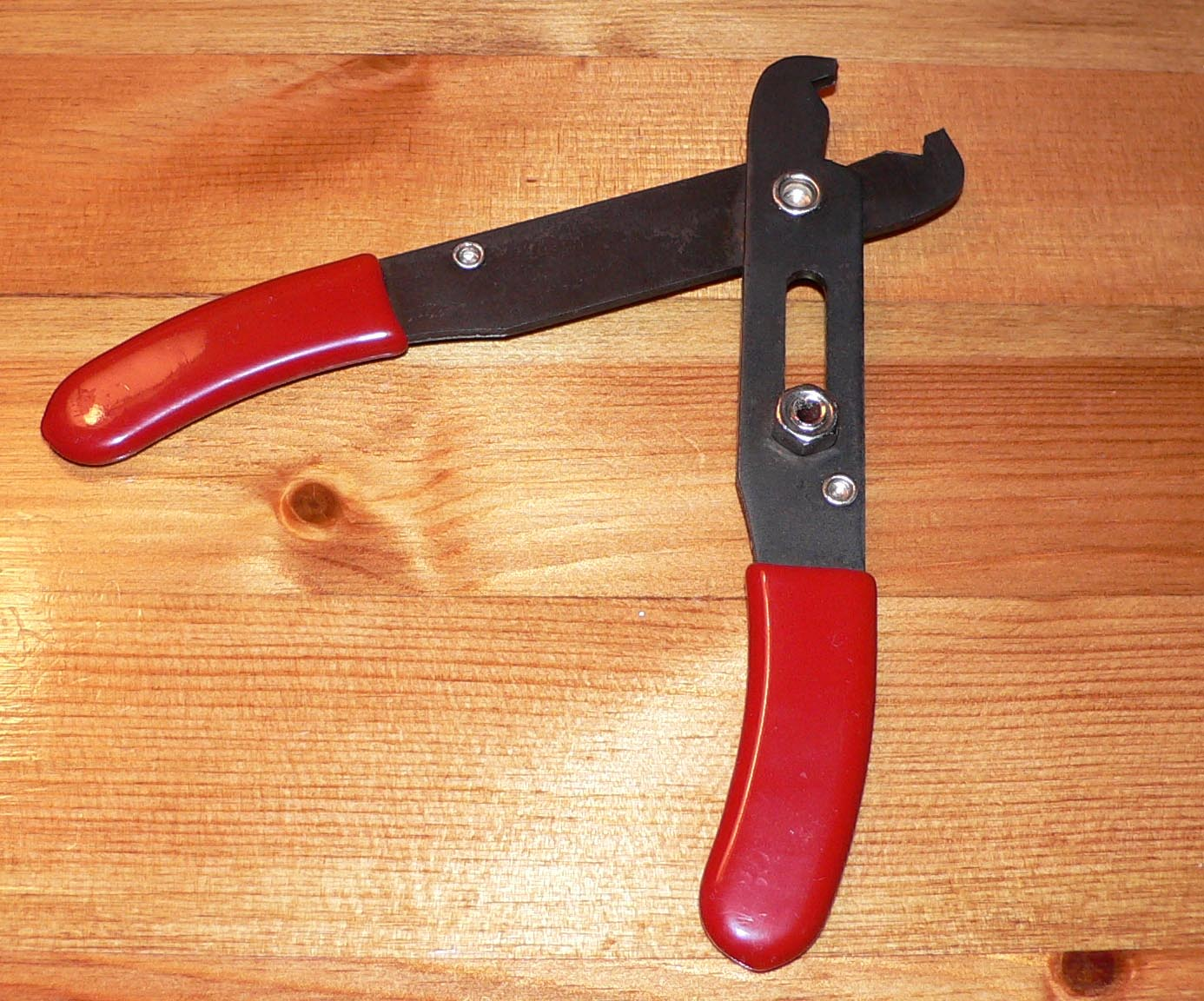
A simple US-style manual wire stripper

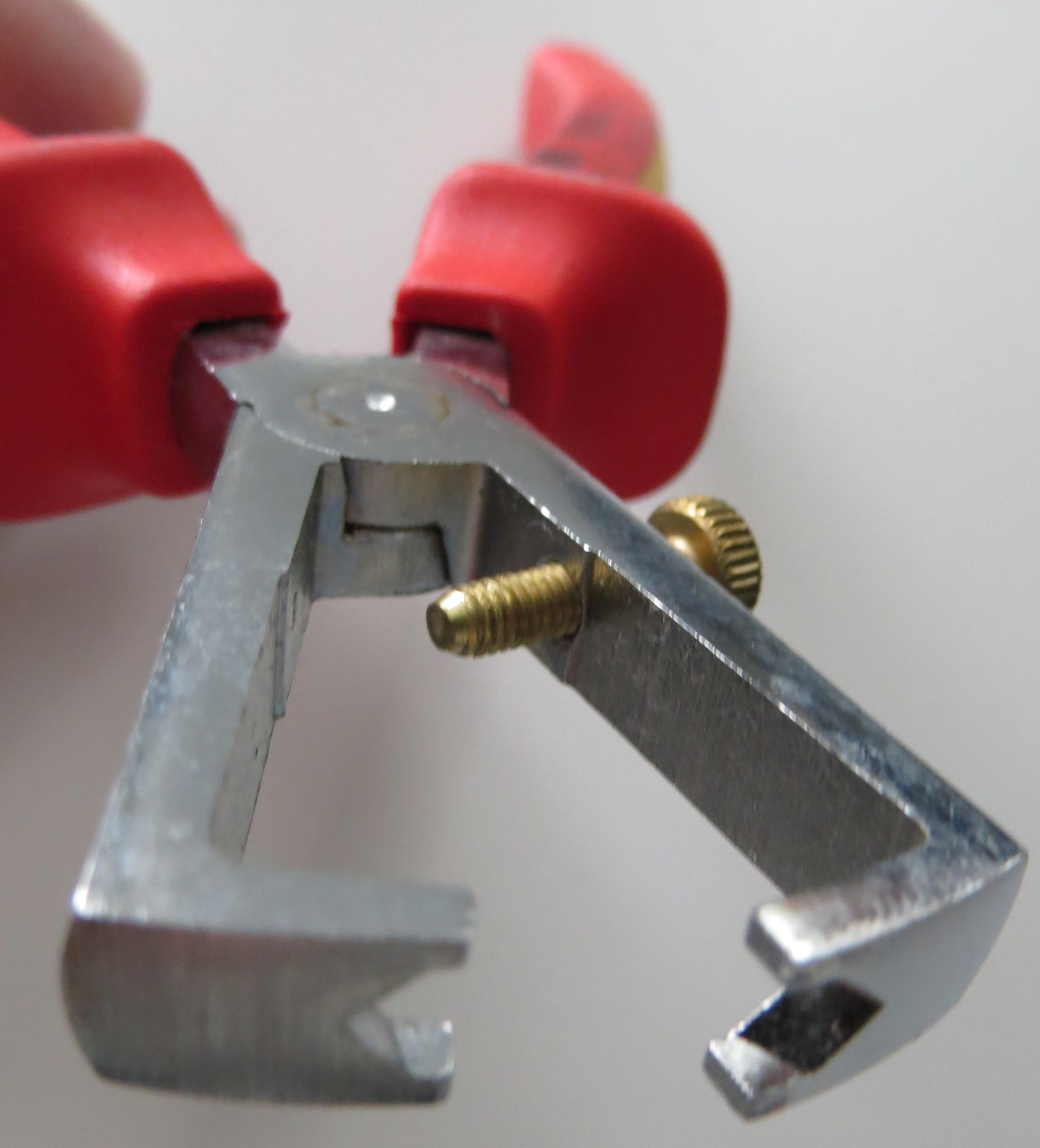
European-style wire stripper

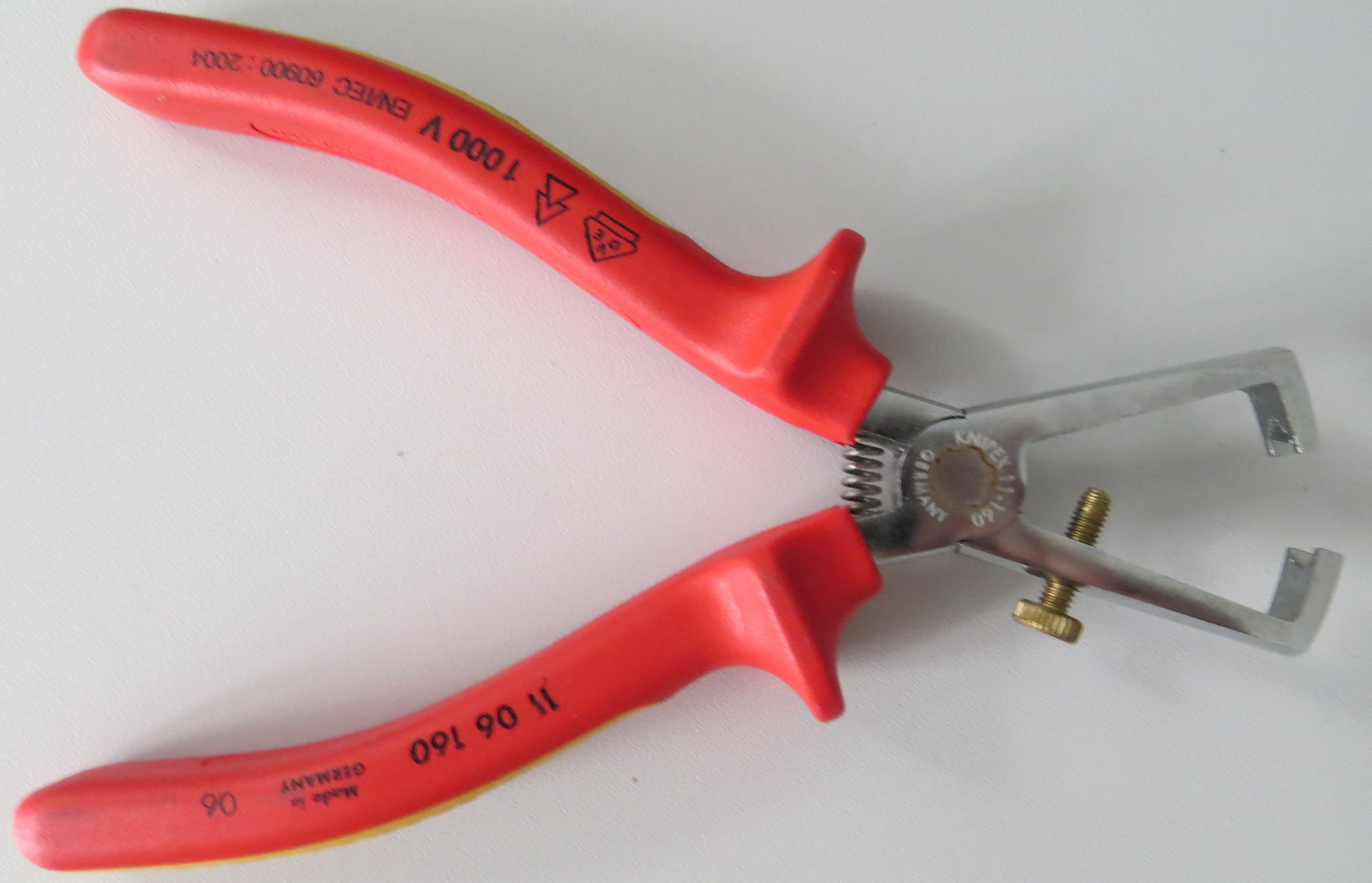
European-style wire stripper

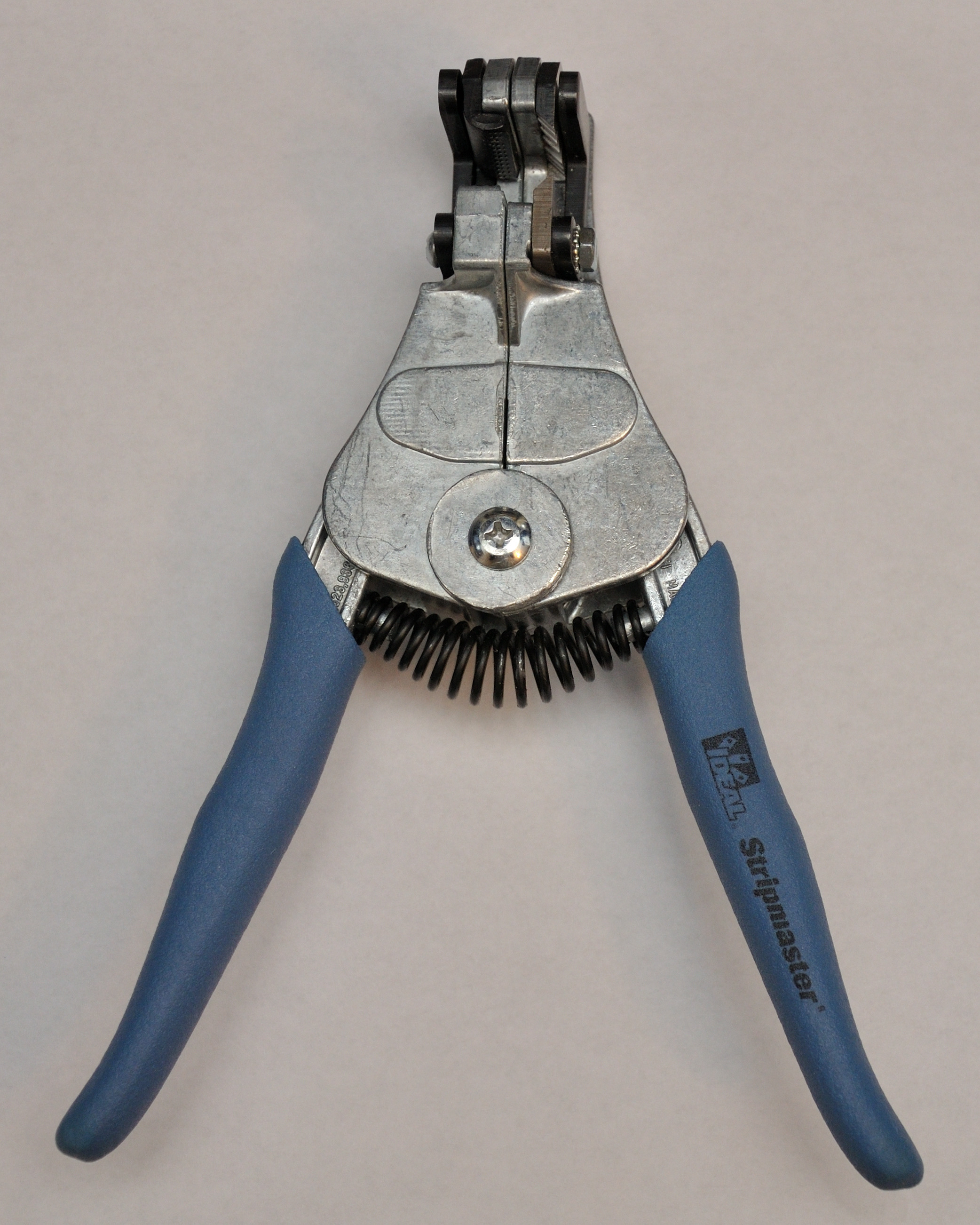
Compound automatic wire stripper

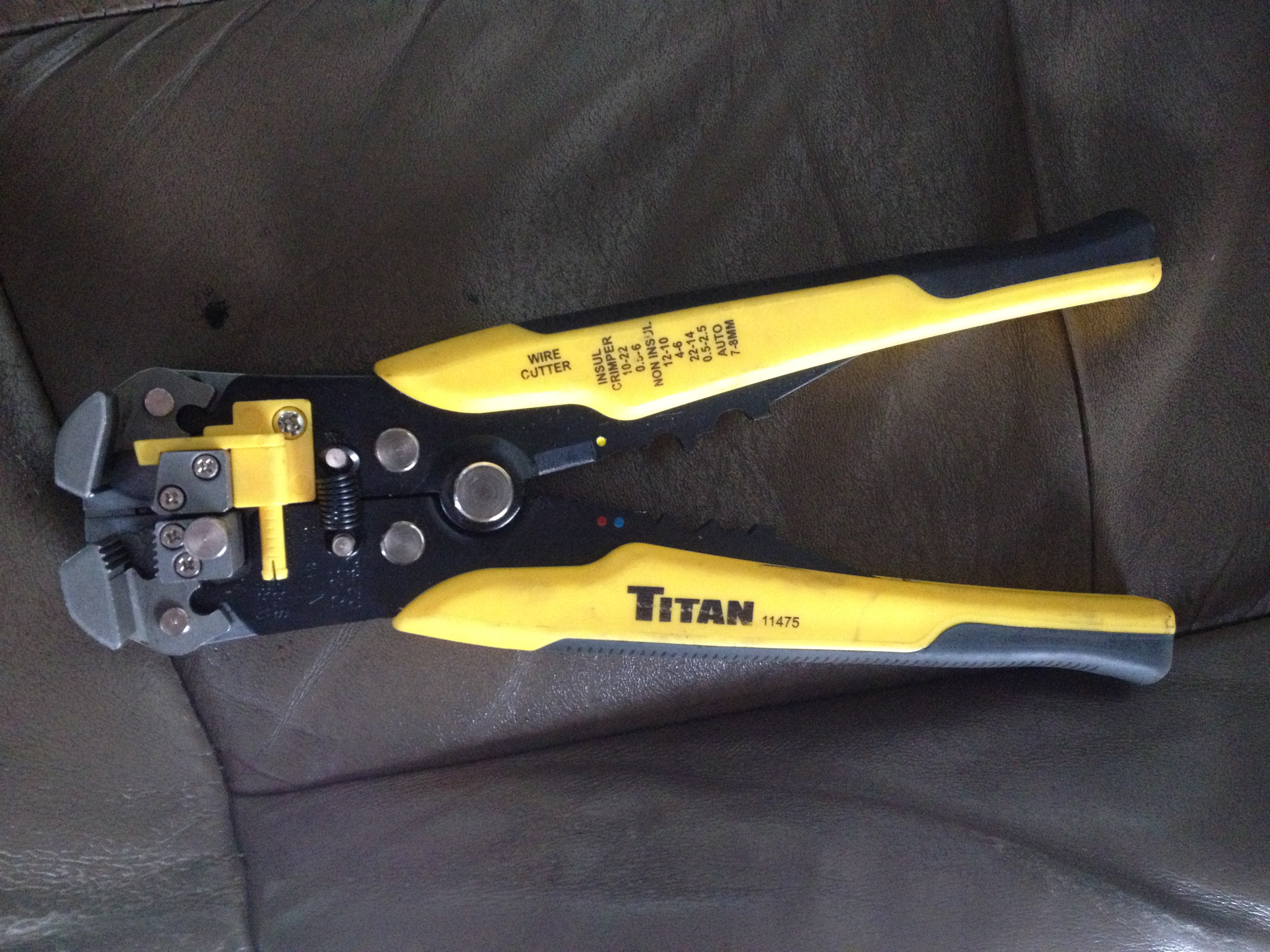
An automatic wire stripper

== See also ==
- Lineman's pliers
- Needle-nose pliers
