= Automated parking system =

Robotic system that parks cars

Automated multi-story parking garage in Tübingen

A Paternoster type of APS

An automated (car) parking system (APS) is a mechanical system designed to minimize the area and/or volume required for parking cars. Like a multi-story parking garage, an APS provides parking for cars on multiple levels stacked vertically to maximize the number of parking spaces while minimizing land usage. The APS, however, utilizes a mechanical system to transport cars to and from parking spaces (rather than the driver) in order to eliminate much of the space wasted in a multi-story parking garage. While a multi-story parking garage is similar to multiple parking lots stacked vertically, an APS is more similar to an automated storage and retrieval system for cars. Parking systems are generally powered by electric motors or hydraulic pumps that move vehicles into a storage position.The paternoster (shown animated at the right) is an example of one of the earliest and most common types of APS.

APS are also generically known by a variety of other names, including:automated parking facility (APF), automated vehicle storage and retrieval system (AVSRS), car parking system, mechanical parking, and robotic parking garage.

== History ==
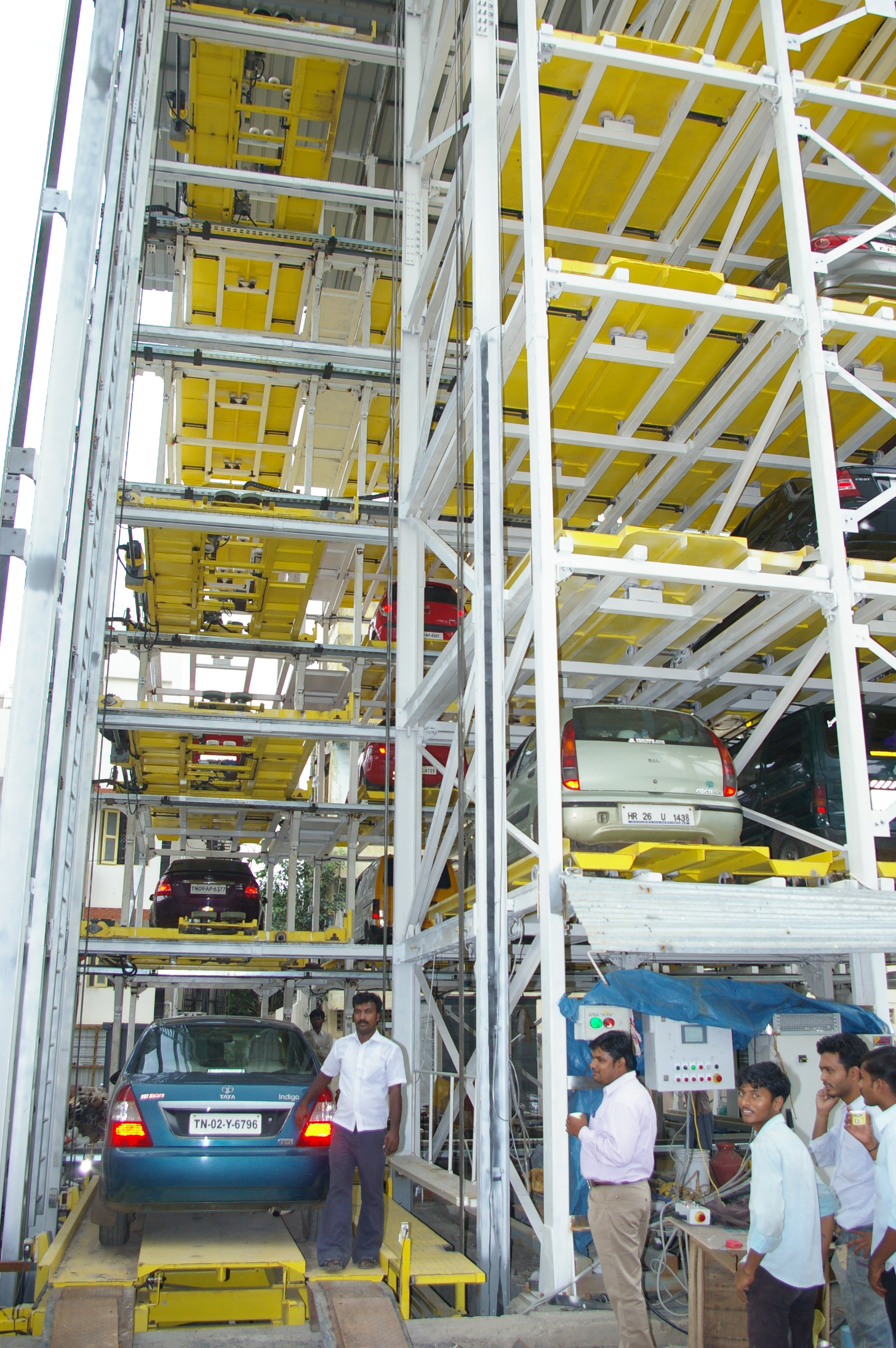
A Semi-Automated Parking System in Chennai, India

The concept for the automated parking system was and is driven by two factors: a need for parking spaces and a scarcity of available land. The earliest use of an APS was in Paris, France in 1905 at the Garage Rue de Ponthieu. The APS consisted of a groundbreaking multi-story concrete structure with an internal car elevator to transport cars to upper levels where attendants parked the cars.

In the 1920s, a Ferris wheel-like APS (for cars rather than people) called a paternoster system became popular as it could park eight cars in the ground space normally used for parking two cars. Mechanically simple with a small footprint, the paternoster was easy to use in many places, including inside buildings. At the same time, Kent Automatic Garages was installing APS with capacities exceeding 1,000 cars. The “ferris-wheel,” or paternoster system — was created by the Westinghouse Corporation in 1923 and subsequently built in 1932 on Chicago's Monroe Street. The Nash Motor Company created the first glass-enclosed version of this system for the Chicago Century of Progress Exhibition in 1933

The first driverless parking garage opened in 1951 in Washington, D.C., but was replaced with office space due to increasing land values.

APS saw a spurt of interest in the U.S. in the late 1940s and 1950s with the Bowser, Pigeon Hole and Roto Park systems. In 1957, 74 Bowser, Pigeon Hole systems were installed, and some of these systems remain in operation. However, interest in APS in the U.S. waned due to frequent mechanical problems and long waiting times for patrons to retrieve their cars. In the United Kingdom, the Auto Stacker opened in 1961 in Woolwich, south east London, but proved equally difficult to operate. Interest in APS in the U.S. was renewed in the 1990s, and there were 25 major current and planned APS projects (representing nearly 6,000 parking spaces) in 2012. The first American robotic parking garage opened in 2002 in Hoboken, New Jersey.

While interest in the APS in the U.S. languished until the 1990s, Europe, Asia and Central America had been installing more technically advanced APS since the 1970s. In the early 1990s, nearly 40,000 parking spaces were being built annually using the paternoster APS in Japan. In 2012, there are an estimated 1.6 million APS parking spaces in Japan.

The ever-increasing scarcity of available urban land (urbanization) and increase of the number of cars in use (motorization) have combined with sustainability and other quality-of-life issues to renew interest in APS as alternatives to multi-storey car parks, on-street parking, and parking lots.

== Largest systems ==
The largest Automated Parking Facility in the world is in Al Jahra, Kuwait, and provides 2,314 parking spaces.

The world's fastest Automated Parking System is in Wolfsburg, Germany, with a retrieval time of 1 minute and 44 seconds.

The largest APS in Europe is at Dokk1 in Aarhus, Denmark, and provides 1,000 parking spaces via 20 car lifts.

== Space saving ==
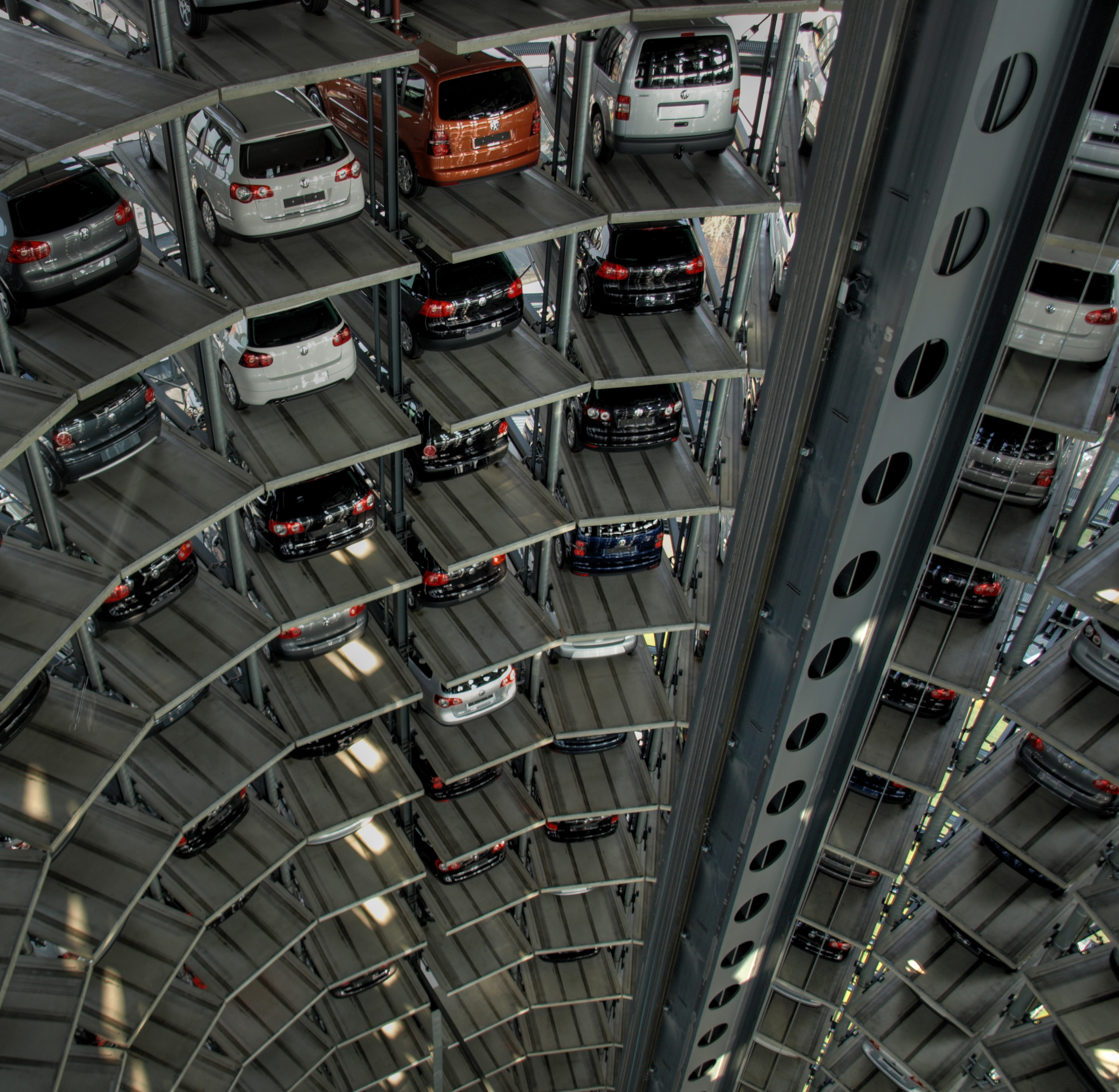
A large fully-automated parking system

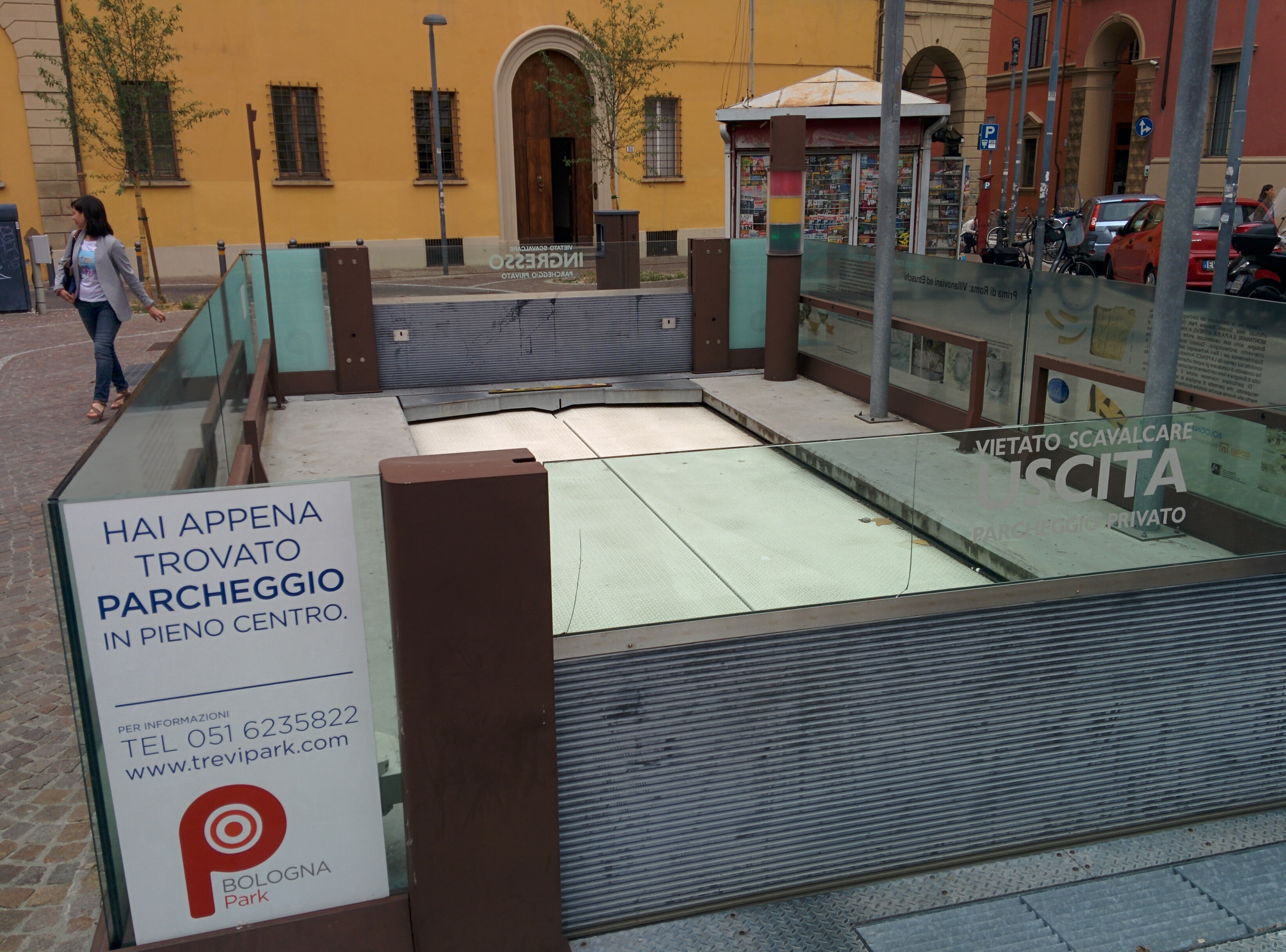
Entrance of an underground automated parking system in historic center of Bologna, Italy

All APS take advantage of a common concept to decrease the area of parking spaces - removing the driver and passengers from the car before it is parked. With either fully automated or semi-automated APS, the car is driven up to an entry point to the APS and the driver and passengers exit the car. The car is then moved automatically or semi-automatically (with some attendant action required) to its parking space.

The space-saving provided by the APS, compared to the multi-story parking garage, is derived primarily from a significant reduction in space not directly related to the parking of the car:

- Parking space width and depth (and distances between parking spaces) are dramatically reduced since no allowance need be made for driving the car into the parking space or for the opening of car doors (for drivers and passengers)
- No driving lanes or ramps are needed to drive the car to/from the entrance/exit to a parking space
- Ceiling height is minimized since there is no pedestrian traffic (drivers and passengers) in the parking area, and
- No walkways, stairways or elevators are needed to accommodate pedestrians in the parking area.

With the elimination of ramps, driving lanes, pedestrians and the reduction in ceiling heights, the APS requires substantially less structural material than the multi-story parking garage. Many APS utilize a steel framework (some use thin concrete slabs) rather than the monolithic concrete design of the multi-story parking garage. These factors contribute to an overall volume reduction and further space savings for the APS.

== Other considerations ==
In addition to the space saving, many APS designs provide a number of secondary benefits:

- The parked cars and their contents are more secure since there is no public access to parked cars
- Minor parking lot damage such as scrapes and dents are eliminated
- Drivers and passengers are safer not having to walk through parking lots or garages
- Driving around in search of a parking space is eliminated, thereby reducing engine emissions and wasted time
- Only minimal ventilation and lighting systems are needed
- Handicap access is improved
- The volume and visual impact of the parking structure is minimized
- Shorter construction time

=== Problems ===
There have been a number of problems with robotic parking systems, particularly in the United States. The systems work well in balanced throughput situations like shopping malls and train stations, but they are unsuited to high peak volume applications like rush hour usage or stadiums and they suffer from technical problems. Further, parkers not familiar with the system may cause problems, for example by failing to push the button to alert a fully automated system to the presence of a car to be parked.

In London around 40 vehicles were trapped for two years in CBRE's system.

== Fully automated vs semi-automated ==
Fully automated parking systems operate much like robotic valet parking. The driver drives the car into an APS entry (transfer) area. The driver and all passengers exit the car. The driver uses an automated terminal nearby for payment and receipt of a ticket. When driver and passengers have left the entry area, the mechanical system lifts the car and transports it to a pre-determined parking space in the system. More sophisticated fully automated APS will obtain the dimensions of cars on entry in order to place them in the smallest available parking space.

The driver retrieves a car by inserting a ticket or code into an automated terminal. The APS lifts the car from its parking space and delivers it to an exit area. Most often, the retrieved car has been oriented to eliminate the need for the driver to back out.

Fully automated APS theoretically eliminate the need for parking attendants.

Semi-automated APS also use a mechanical system of some type to move a car to its parking space, however putting the car into and/or the operation of the system requires some action by an attendant or the driver.

The choice between fully and semi-automated APS is often a matter of space and cost, however large capacity (> 100 cars) tend to be fully automated.

== Applications ==
By virtue of their relatively smaller volume and mechanized parking systems, APS are often used in locations where a multi-story parking garage would be too large, too costly or impractical. Examples of such applications include, under or inside existing or new structures, between existing structures and in irregularly shaped areas.

APS can also be applied in situations similar to multi-storey parking garages such as freestanding above ground, under buildings above grade and under buildings below grade.

== Costs ==
The direct comparison of costs between an APS and a multi-story parking garage can be complicated by many variables such as capacity, land costs, area shape, number and location of entrances and exits, land usage, local codes and regulations, parking fees, location, and aesthetic and environmental requirements.

Following is a comparison of building costs for generic APS and multi-story parking garages:

| Application | Type | Parking Spaces | sq ft (m^{2}) per Space | Building Cost | Cost per Space |
|---|---|---|---|---|---|
| Freestanding Above Grade | Parking Garage | 200 | 320 (30) | $3,200,000 | $16,000 |
| Freestanding Above Grade | APS | 200 | 225 (20.9) | $5,225,000 | $26,125 |
| Below Building Above Grade | Parking Garage | 200 | 450 (42) | $6,750,000 | $33,750 |
| Below Building Above Grade | APS | 200 | 225 (20.9) | $6,125,000 | $30,625 |
| Below Building Below Grade | Parking Garage | 200 | 450 (42) | $9,450,000 | $47,250 |
| Below Building Below Grade | APS | 200 | 225 (20.9) | $7,025,000 | $35,125 |

The comparison above is for building costs only. Not included, for example, is the cost of land or the opportunity cost of the use of the land (i.e. the value of the additional space made available by the smaller size of the APS). As evidence of the complexities of comparing the costs for APS and multi-story parking garages, the same author presents an actual case study as follows:

| Application | Type | Parking Spaces | sq ft (m^{2}) per Space | Building Cost | Cost per Space |
|---|---|---|---|---|---|
| Freestanding Above Grade | Parking Garage | 203 | 445 (41.3) | $6,000,000 | $29,600 |
| Freestanding Above Grade | APS | 217 | 268 (24.9) | $6,200,000 | $28,200 |

In this case study, the APS also provides roughly 7,000 sq ft (650 m^{2}) of additional open space compared to the multi-story parking garage which provides no open space and requires minimum setbacks be utilized. Other references also indicate that the cost comparison between APS and multi-story parking garages is highly dependent on the application and the detailed design.

== See also ==
- Automated storage and retrieval system
- Sustainability
