= Sewing gauge =

Ruler used for measuring short spaces

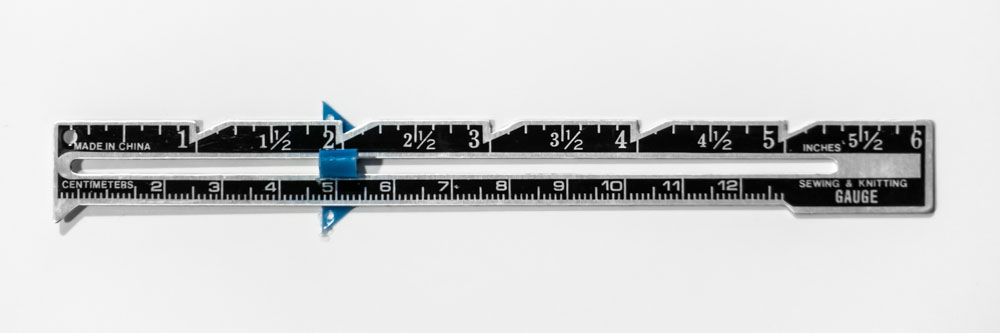
A 6" long sewing gauge with a plastic slider

A sewing gauge is a ruler, typically 6 inches long, used for measuring short spaces. It is typically a metal scale, marked in both inches and centimeters with a sliding pointer, similar in use to a caliper. It is used to mark hems for alterations as well as intervals between pleats and buttonholes and buttonhole lengths. It can be also used as a compass to draw arcs and circles by anchoring the slider with a pin and placing the tip of a marking pencil in the hole located at the end of the scale. Some models also incorporate a button shank and a blunt point for turning corners right side out.
