= Tack cloth =

Type of wiping cloth

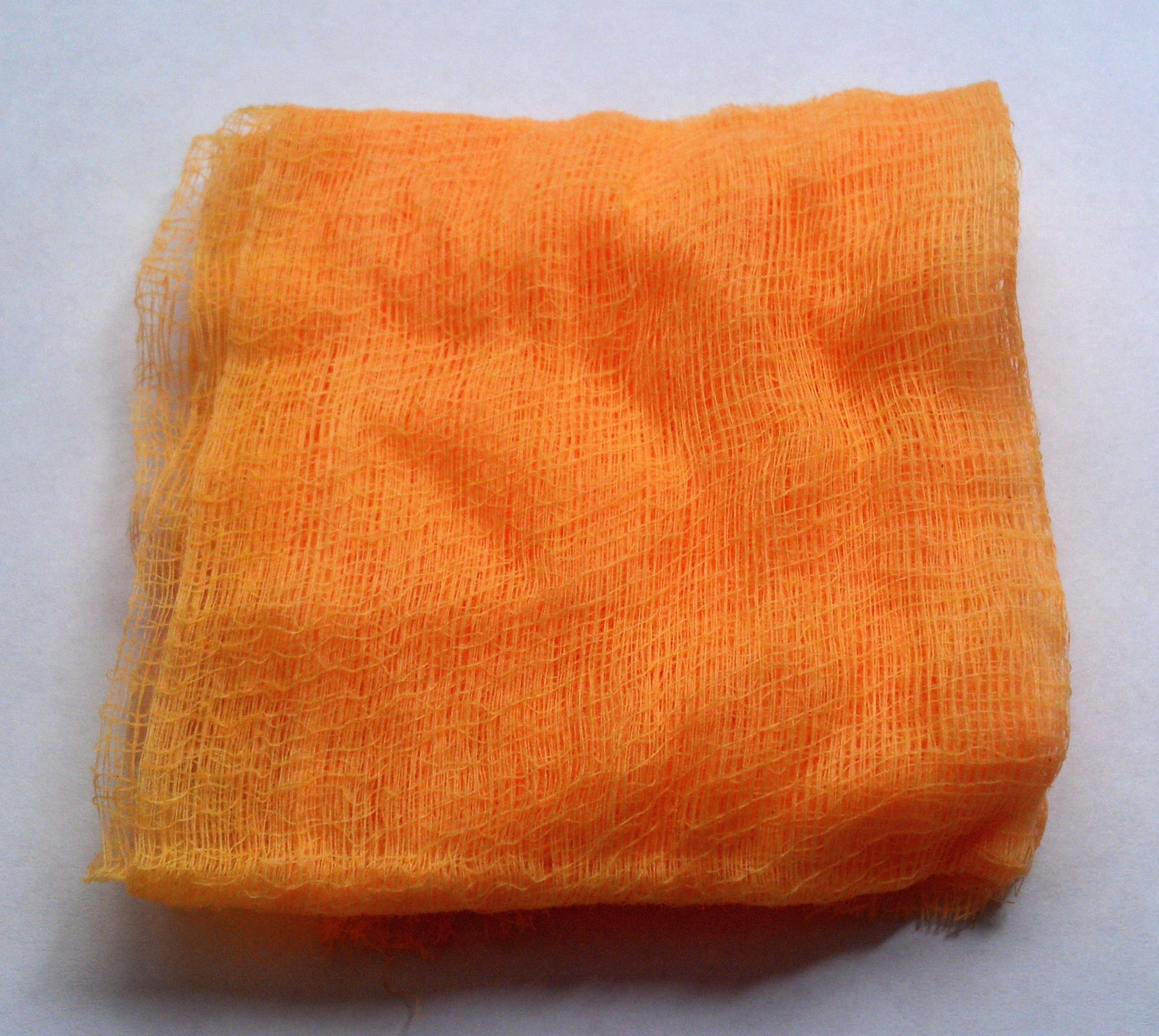
A tack cloth made of gauze impregnated with a tacky material

Tack cloth (tack rag; tac cloth) is a specialized type of wiping cloth that is treated with a tacky material. It is designed to remove loose particles of dust, dirt and lint that would contaminate a surface that is to be painted, coated, laminated, photo-etched, or otherwise finished.

== Design ==
=== Tack ===
The tack component is typically a kind of resinous material, often a petroleum derivative. The resin system may be solvent-based, water-based, or (more commonly in North America) a hot-melt. Different tack treatment materials, formulations and systems present different advantages or disadvantages. Concerns with different tack treatments may be seen in the tendencies of some to dry out or to leave residues from free oils or evaporating solvents, or with liabilities due to content of hazardous air pollutants (HAPs), or in health risk from volatile organic components (VOCs), and in materials that can chemically interfere with paints, etc. Common misnomers for tack treatments are varnish, lacquer, beeswax or other references that do not describe the actual materials in modern commercial tack cloths. Adjuncts may be incorporated into the tack treatments, such as anti-static additives, fire retardants, dyes or other performance-enhancing materials.

Overall tack performance is actually a combination of independent qualities such as adhesion, cohesion, wet tack (quick-stick) and other well-defined adhesive related properties. Each of these can be manipulated to optimize performance in different types of applications and conditions. Tack cloth must be changed frequently when working with softer woods as the dust from the sanded wood tends to clog the cloth fibers quickly, reducing performance.

=== Cloth ===
The cloth component is most commonly a cotton gauze textile, but the grade and quality can vary greatly. Typical gauze specifications are in weaves of 29 (commodity) to 44 or more (commercial/professional) yarns per square inch, with the cloth weights, wiping properties and overall cost varying accordingly. Gauze may be bleached and scoured (as for medical gauze) or unbleached quality that contains more contaminants. A standard size of the cotton gauze varieties is 18 in. × 36 in. in North America (other standards are found in other countries, such as 50 cm × 80 cm). Other textiles used in tack cloths are made from continuous filament (non-fibrous) synthetic yarns to eliminate linting or from various non-woven fabrics that can reduce cost. The textile type, style, grade, quality and size are the greatest factors in tack cloth cost, and these variables can differ greatly among tack cloth brands and product designs.

== Innovations ==
In recent decades, researchers have developed lint-free tack cloths, made from continuous filament (non-fibrous) synthetic yarns and finished edges. Similar to electronics cleanroom wipers, this design is commonly required for paint process in automotive assembly plants. Another innovation has been modification of common tack cloths that are normally electrically resistive to perform at antistatic levels, defined by independent standards organizations (like ASTM, IEEE, MIL-SPEC, etc.).

More recent developments have been made in tack treatments that are water-soluble, allowing them to be washed from hands, tools or a surface to reduce the incidence of tack transfer from accumulated resins or to wash the tack from the cloths. They can be recycled like utility wipes. Water-soluble tack also improves antistatic performance, and offers potential for improved compatibility with water-based paints.

A new type of tack cloth has been developed at the Y-12 National Security Complex, a nuclear weapons plant. Its purpose was to clean up microscopic beryllium particles that posed a health hazard. The inventor, Ron Simandl, also found he could use the cloths to dry-buff the alloy wheels on his car. The stubborn brake and road dirt came right off and left the wheels clean and bright.
