= Pipecutter =

Tool used to cut pipe

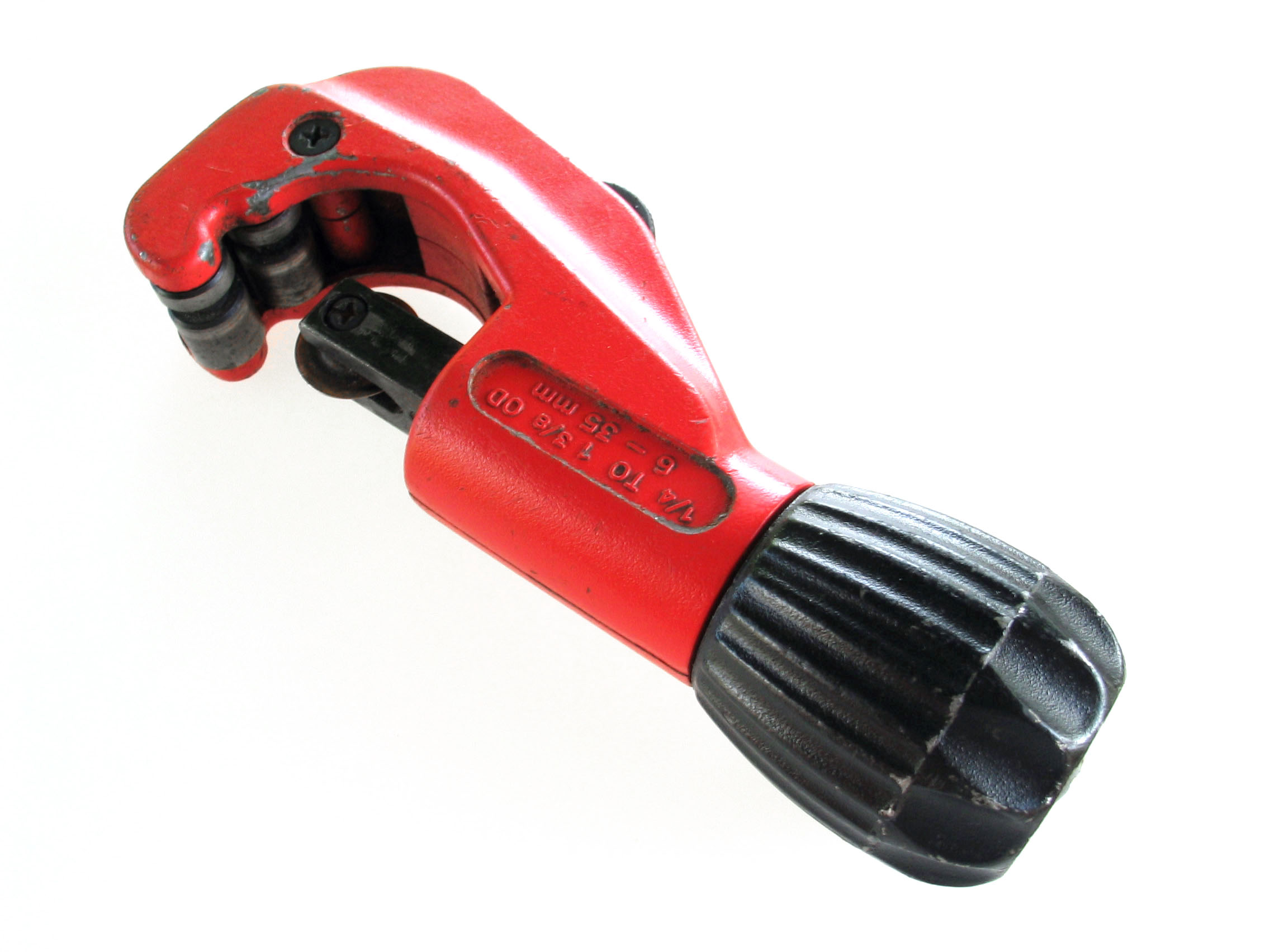
Pipecutter

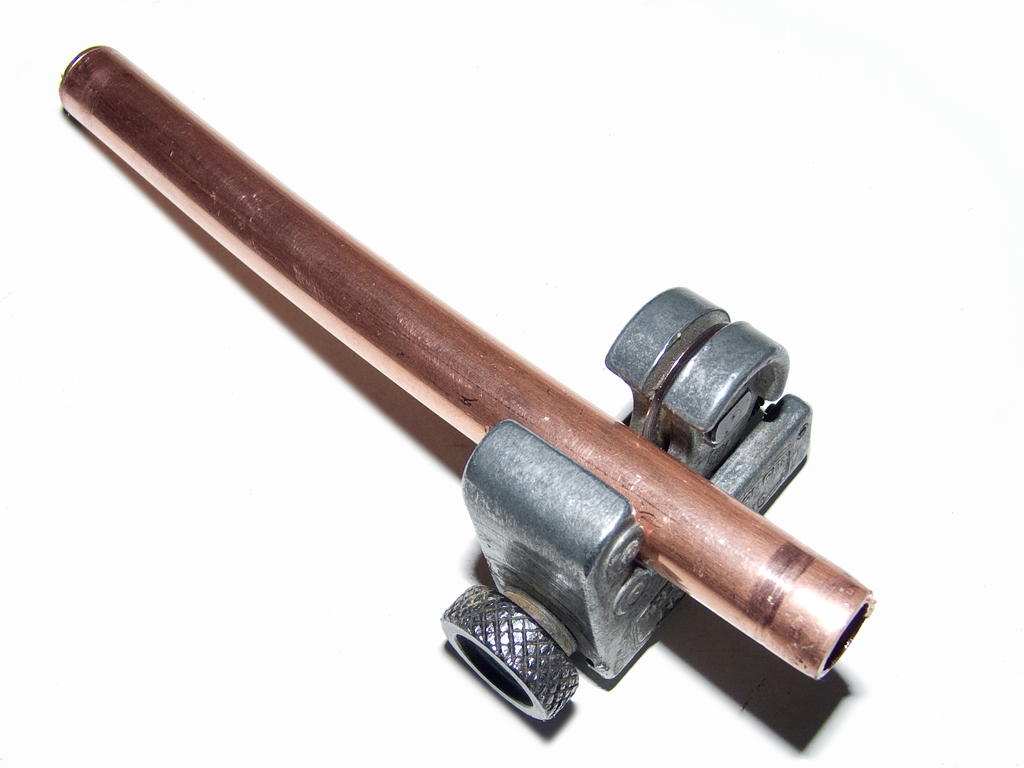
Cutting copper pipe with a close quarters tubing cutter

A pipecutter is a type of tool used to cut pipe. Depending on the metal of the pipe, a pipecutter can often provide a faster, cleaner and more convenient way of cutting pipe than using a hacksaw.

There are two types of pipe cutters. Plastic tubing cutters, which resemble a pair of pruning shears, may be used for thinner pipes and tubes, such as sprinkler pipe. For use on thicker pipes, there is a pipecutter with a sharp wheel and adjustable jaw grips. These are used by rotating it around the pipe and repeatedly tightening it until it cuts all of the way through. They are also used to quietly remove the catalytic converters off of cars and trucks of any kind, because of their precious metals.

== Pipecutters vs. hacksaws ==
Hacksaws will cut nearly any size pipe made out of metals and plastics. Pipecutters, on the other hand, are more limited. In the situations where they work, they are generally accepted to leave cleaner cuts on the outer surface of the tube. The cut can leave a burr around the inside of the tube. This burr should be cleaned or reamed when cutting electrical conduit to prevent stripping of the insulating coating from the wires. In fluid handling applications, the burr should also be removed, as it can restrict the flow and cause turbulence.
