= Ear protection =

Ear protection may pertain to protecting the ear from cold, intrusion by water or debris, or noise. It may refer to:

- Hearing protection device
- Earplug
- Earmuffs
