= Bead roller =

Machine tool

A bead roller is a machine tool that makes rigid lines in sheet metal to make surfaces more rugged and durable. The lines bead rollers add to sheet metal prevent warping and disfigurement by adding structural integrity to the metal. Bead rollers also can be used in an artistic and creative form by allowing metalworkers to create unique designs and patterns on metal.

== History ==
Bead rollers originated in the early days of HVAC, being used initially for specialized work on ducts installed in residential buildings.

== Functionality ==
Though bead rollers come in many different sizes and shapes, they all use one convex and one concave piece of metal that press together to create indentations in the sheet metal. Bead rollers come in electronic and mechanical forms.

== See also ==
- English wheel
- Tube beading
