= Car elevator =

Elevator designed for the vertical transportation of vehicles

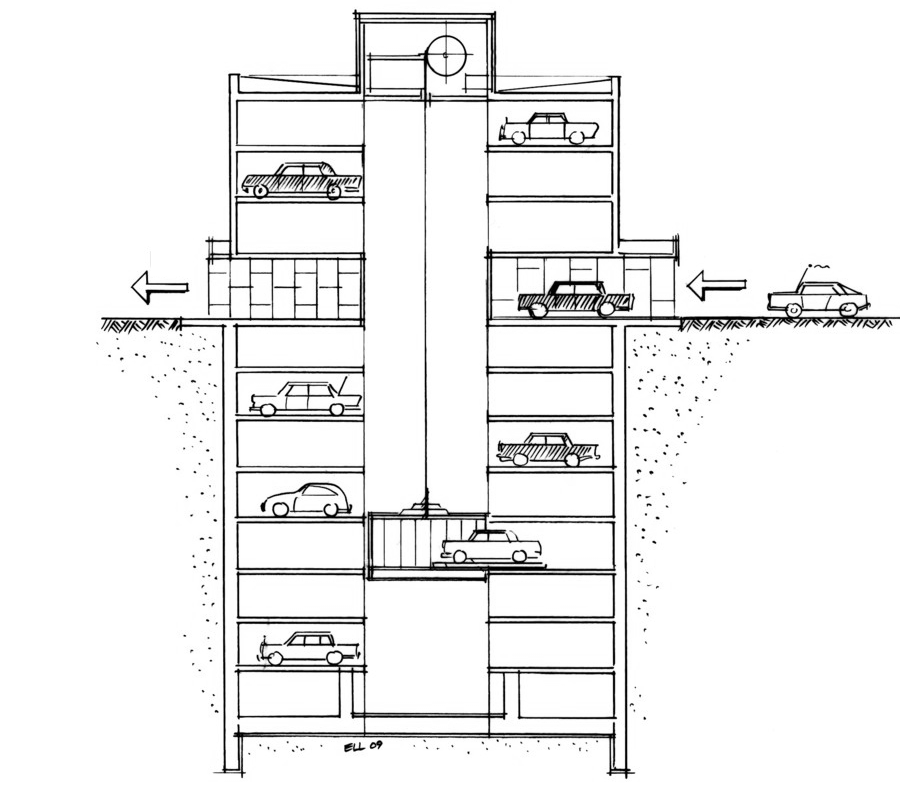

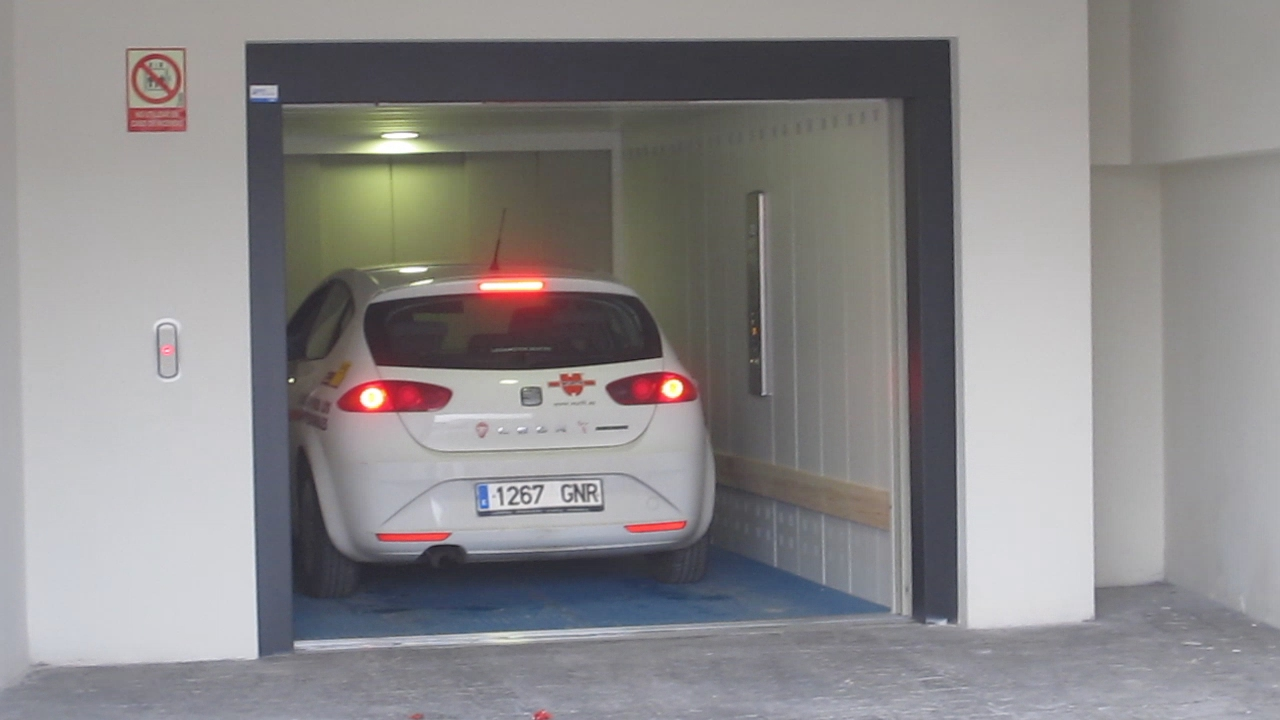
A car elevator

A car elevator or vehicle elevator is an elevator designed for the vertical transportation of vehicles inside buildings, so increasing the number of vehicles that can be parked in parking lots and parking garages. Where real estate is costly, these car parking systems can reduce overall costs by using less land to park the same number of cars.

Vehicle lifts, which lift a car at its center of gravity, are used in garages and repair shops and are designed to allow access to a car's undercarriage for repair.

== Examples ==
American politician and former presidential candidate Mitt Romney included a car elevator in his 2008 proposal for rebuilding his beach house in La Jolla, San Diego. The elevator is intended to transport cars between floors in a planned split-level, four-vehicle garage. Romney received final approval for the project in October 2013, after an appeal against San Diego's approval of the project was dismissed.

The Porsche Design Tower, a high-rise residential building with 132 units in Sunny Isles Beach, Florida, near Miami, contains three car elevators. The elevators, named "Dezervators" after building developer Gil Dezer, transport cars up to parking spaces directly connected to each apartment unit. The elevators are in circular glass structures and rotate to align with the correct car parking space, allowing residents to exit directly from their cars to their apartments. The building opened in 2017. Another nearby building in Sunny Isles Beach, the Bentley Residences, uses the same technology in a slightly larger building. It will have more automobile capacity with four car elevators and be the tallest building in Sunny Isles Beach.

The Boring Company, a company owned by entrepreneur Elon Musk, built a prototype car elevator in 2017. In 2018, the company received permission from the Hawthorne, California city council to construct a car elevator designed to connect an above-ground garage to the Boring Test Tunnel, an underground test tunnel. The Boring Company intends to use the test tunnel and elevator for research and development of a proposed underground Hyperloop system designed to solve traffic congestion in Los Angeles.

== Regulatory classification and safety standards ==
The regulatory treatment of car elevators depends on their design, speed, intended use and jurisdiction. In the European Union, lifts intended to transport persons, or persons and goods, are generally regulated under the Lifts Directive 2014/33/EU when their speed exceeds 0.15 m/s. Lifting appliances with a speed not greater than 0.15 m/s, and other lifting devices outside the scope of the Lifts Directive, are generally treated as machinery and fall under the Machinery Directive 2006/42/EC. The Machinery Directive is scheduled to be replaced by Regulation (EU) 2023/1230 from 20 January 2027.

Vehicle parking systems may also be assessed with reference to standards specific to powered parking equipment. In Europe, EN 14010:2003+A1:2009, ‘‘Safety of machinery – Equipment for power driven parking of motor vehicles – Safety and EMC requirements for design, manufacturing, erection and commissioning stages’’, addresses safety and electromagnetic compatibility requirements for permanently installed power-driven parking equipment. The standard applies to equipment and systems for the power-driven parking of four-wheeled motor vehicles within specified vehicle size and mass limits, and may cover manually or automatically controlled equipment.

Because car elevators may be designed either as passenger-accessible lifts, vehicle lifts, parking systems or bespoke machinery integrated into buildings, the applicable conformity assessment and safety requirements may differ between products and jurisdictions. National building, fire-safety and workplace-safety rules may also apply in addition to product-safety legislation.

== See also ==
- Automated parking system
- Car ramp
