= Slide hammer =

Hand tool

Diagram of the usage of a slide hammer

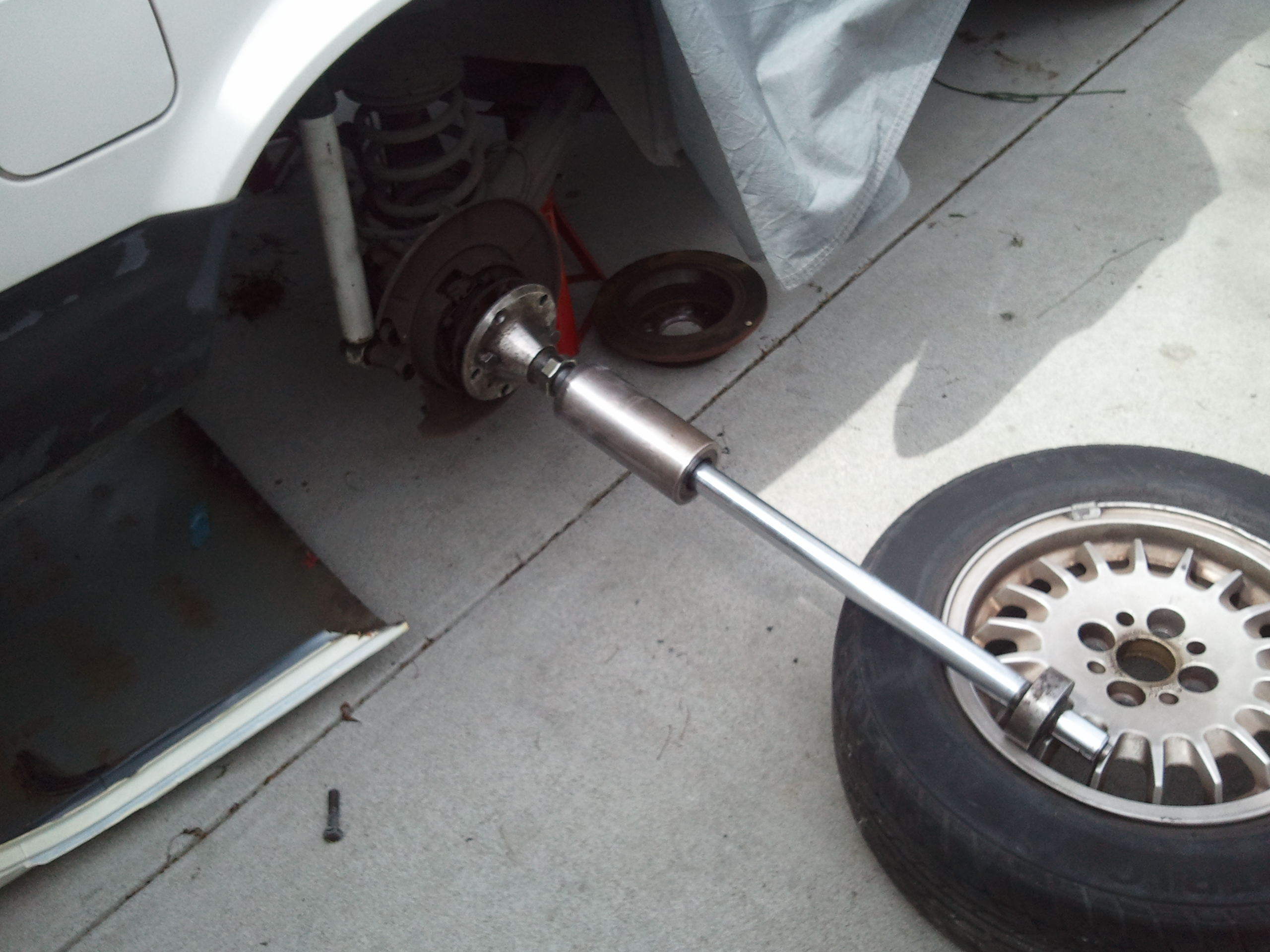
A slide hammer attached to the inside of a rear wheel bearing

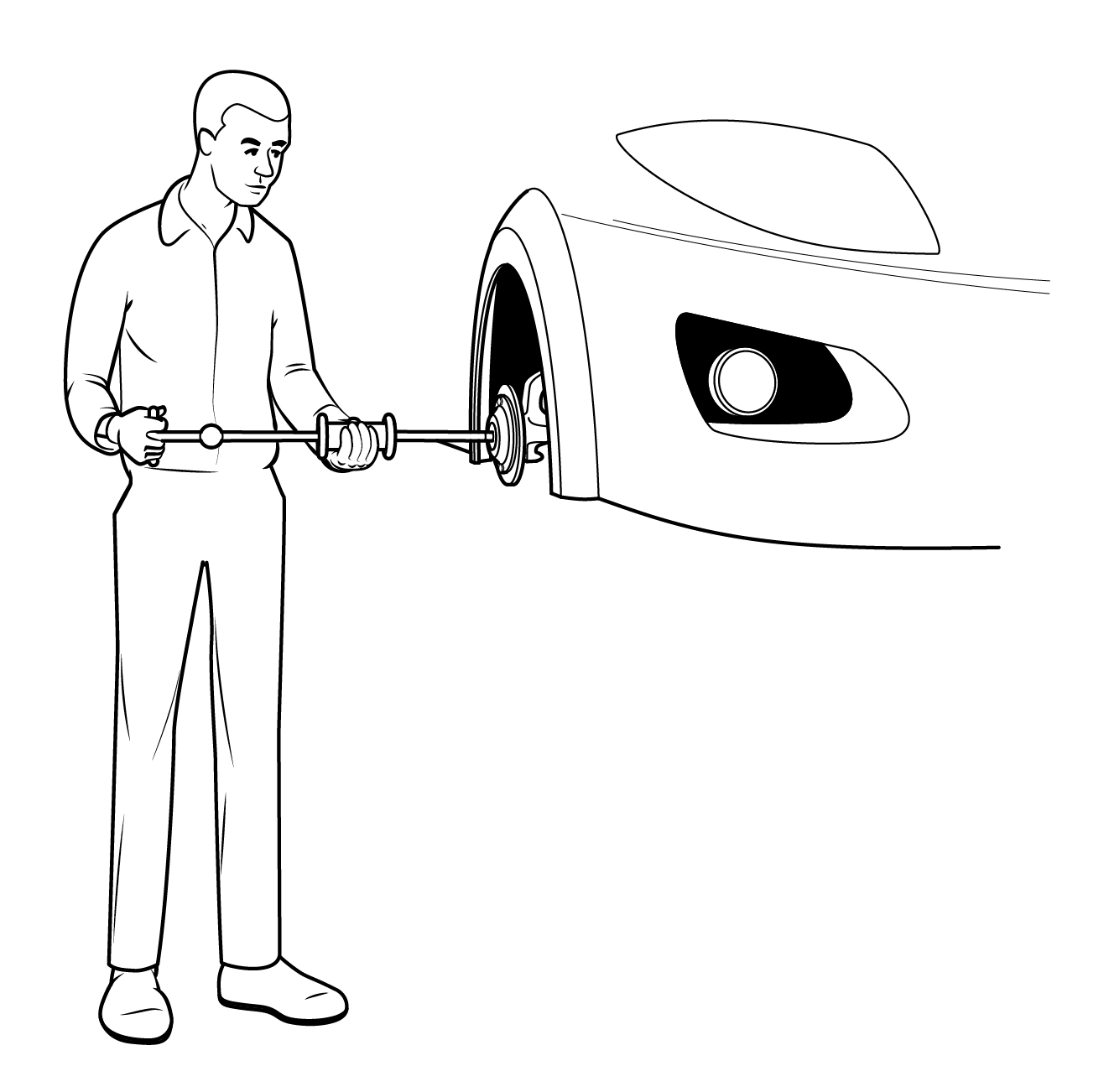
Auto technician using a slide hammer to remove the hub on a car

A slide hammer is a tool that attaches to an object needing to be pulled and transmits an impact force to the object without striking the object itself.

Slide hammers typically consist of a long metal shaft with an attachment point at one end, a heavy weight that can slide along the shaft, and a stop for the weight to impact on the end opposite the attachment point. The inertia of the weight is thus transferred to the shaft, pulling the attached end in the direction the weight had been moving.

Slide hammers can be attached to objects in multiple ways including screw threads, hooks, and others.

Slide hammers are typically used in automotive repair to pull dents, remove bearings or other parts, and when an object needs to be struck from an inaccessible side. Car thieves have used them by attaching a screw to the end; the screw is then twisted into the ignition lock, allowing the whole assembly to be pulled out and the ignition wires to be accessed.
