= Diagonal pliers =

Cutting tool

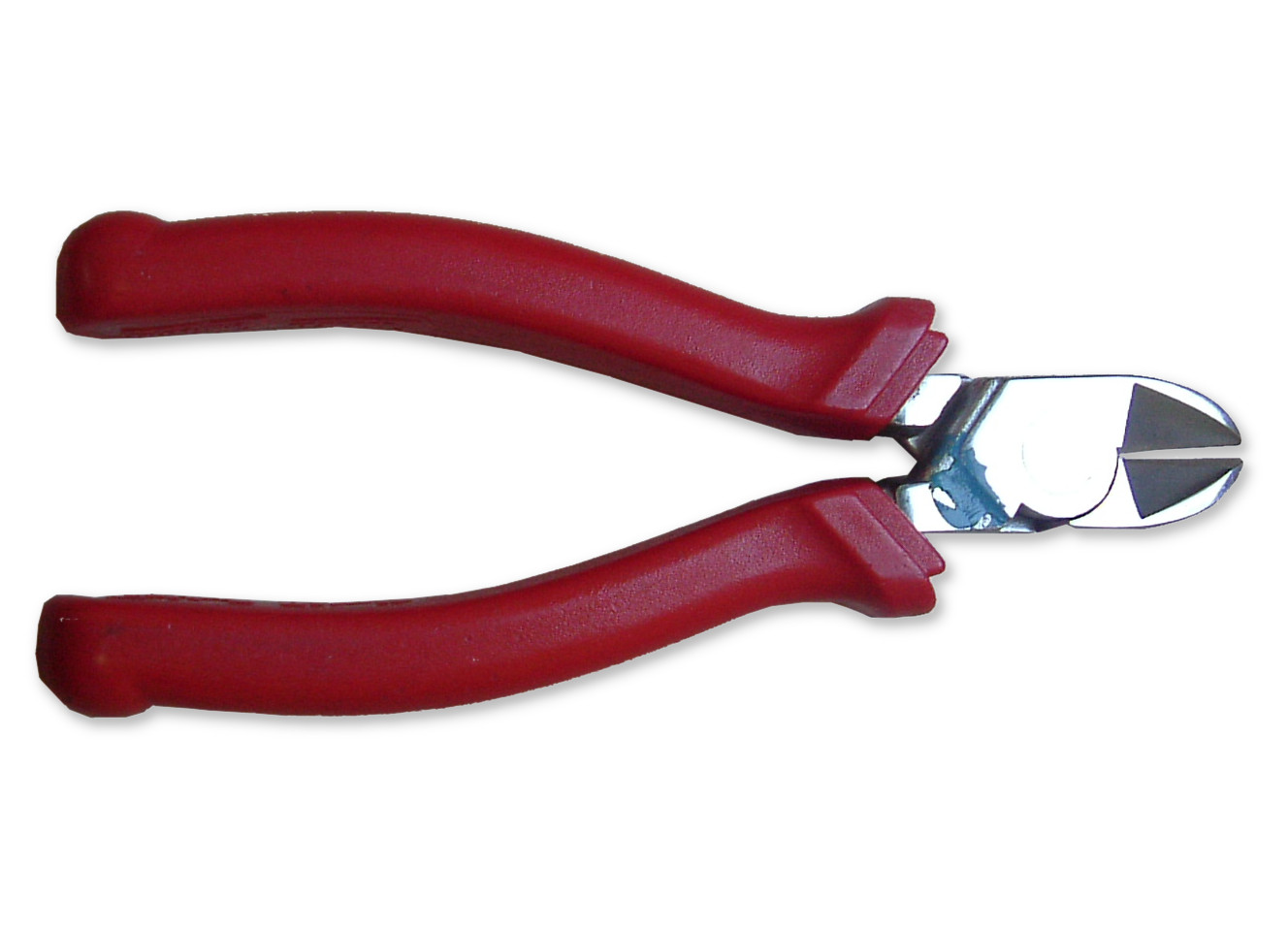
Diagonal pliers

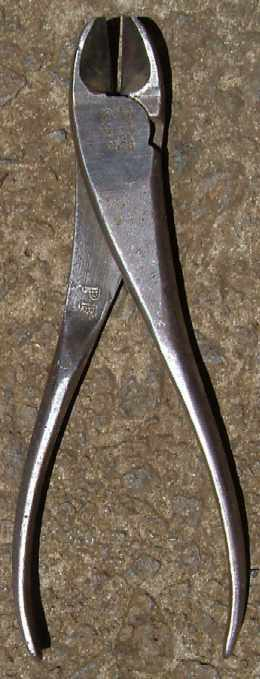
Diagonal pliers with uninsulated handles

Diagonal pliers (also known as wire cutters or diagonal cutting pliers, or under many regional names) are pliers intended for the cutting of wire or small stock, rather than grabbing or turning. The plane defined by the cutting edges of the jaws intersects the joint rivet at an angle or "on a diagonal", giving pliers their name.

They are also adapted for use in inaccessible places.

== Action ==
Instead of using a shearing action as with scissors, diagonal pliers cut by indenting and wedging the wire apart. The jaw edges are ground to a symmetrical "V" shape, thus the two jaws can be visualized to form the letter "X", as seen end-on when closed. The blades are made of tempered steel, and inductive heating and quenching are often used to harden the jaws.

== Jargon ==
In UK English and Irish English, diagonal pliers are commonly referred to as snips, nippers or side cutters. The term snips commonly refers to larger items, not to those used for cutting electrical wiring etc. In Canada, Australia and New Zealand too, the items are often referred to as side cutters.

Diags, dykes or dikes is jargon used especially in the US electrical industry to describe diagonal pliers. "Dike" can also be used (but only colloquially) as a verb, as in the phrase "when in doubt, dike it out".

== Insulation ==
The handles of diagonal cutting pliers are commonly insulated with a dip-type or shrink fit electrically insulating material for comfort and some protection against electric shock.

== Uses ==
Diagonal pliers are useful for cutting copper, brass, iron, aluminium and steel wire. Lower quality versions are generally not suitable for cutting tempered steel, such as piano wire, as the jaws are not hard enough. Attempting to cut such material will usually cause indentations to be made in the jaws, or a piece to break out of one or both jaws, thus ruining the tool. However higher quality side cutters can cut hardened steel, such as 2 mm piano wire.

== Variations ==
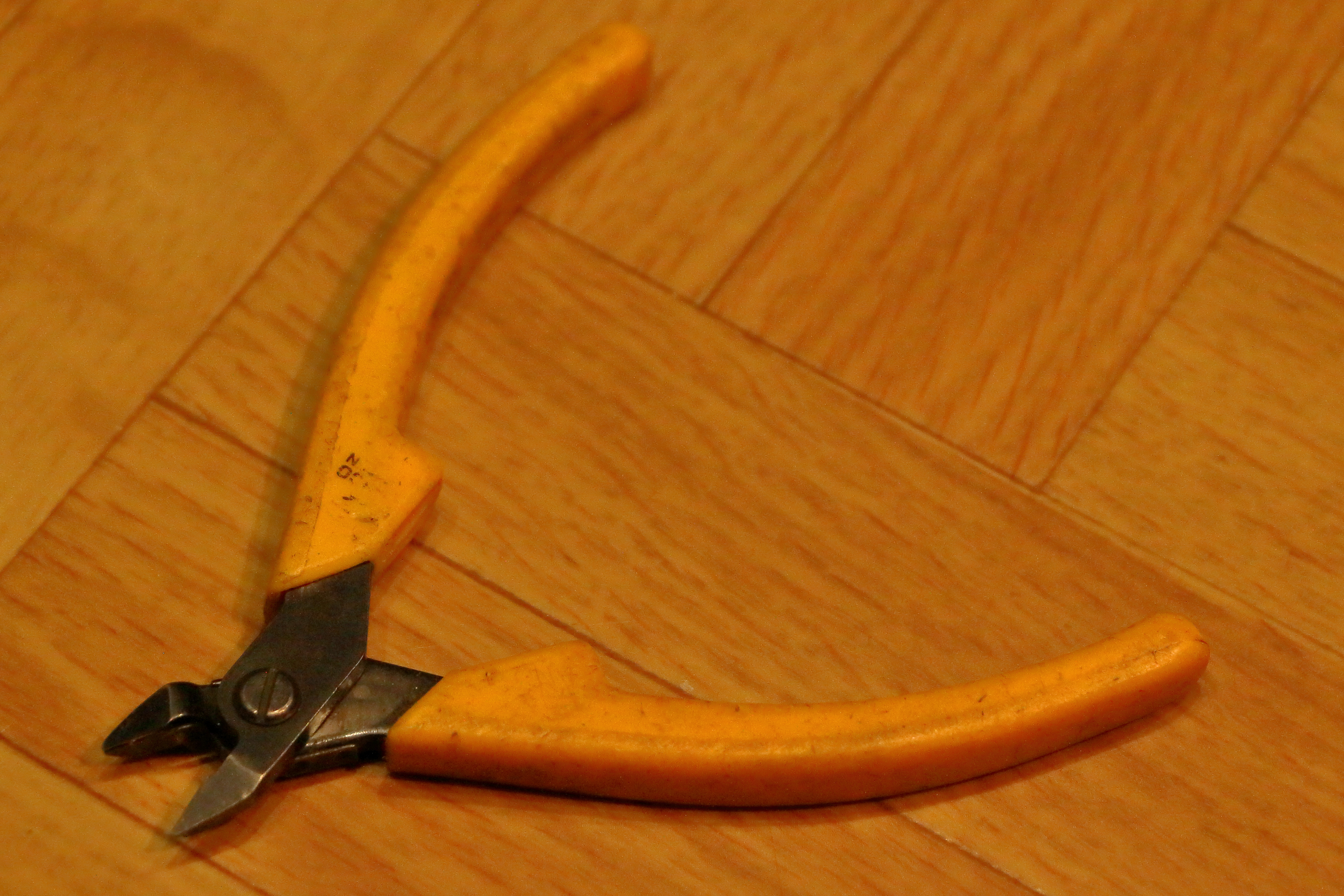
Light-duty flush cutting wire cutters with offcut retaining finger

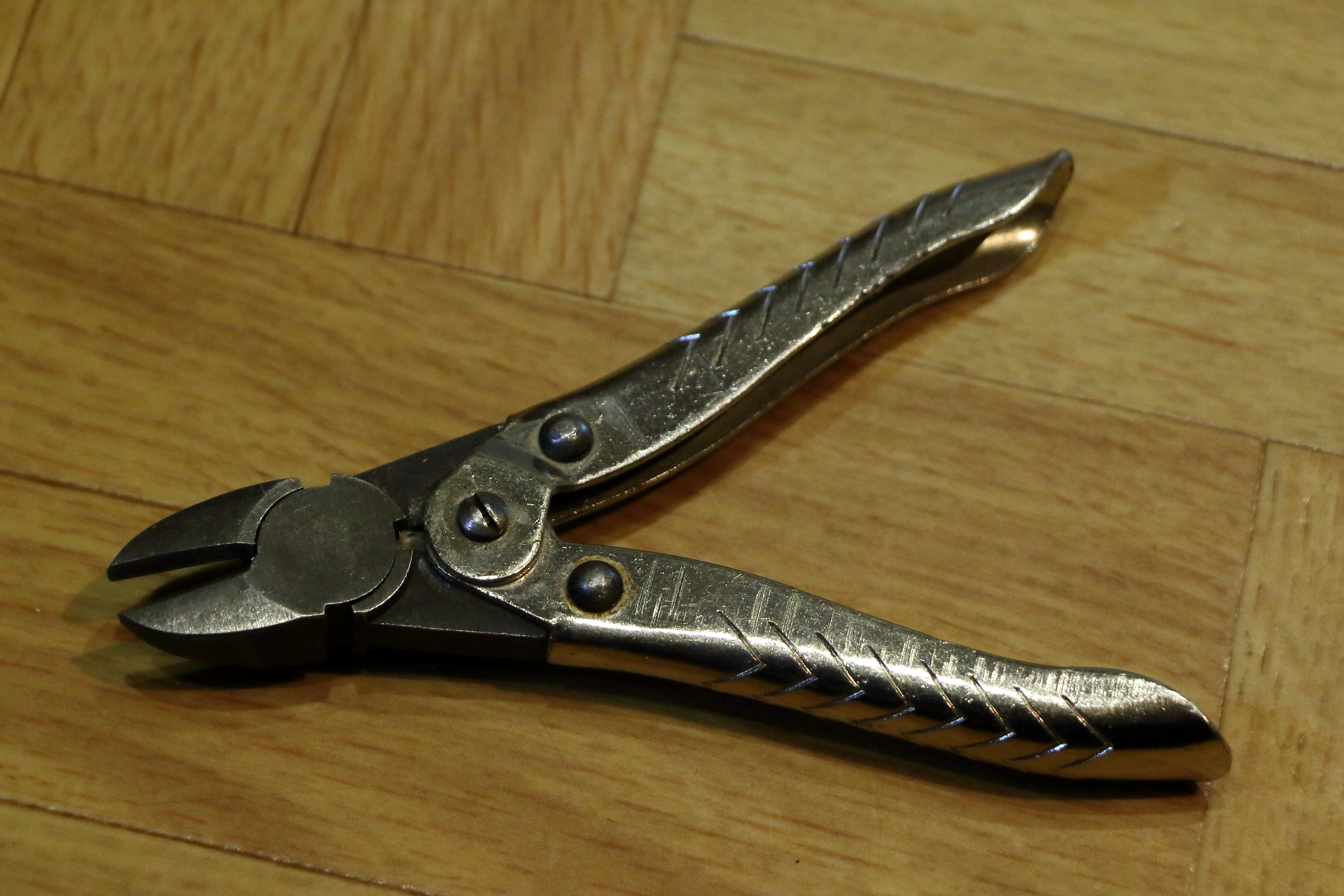
Compound-action wire cutters

For electronics work, special diagonal cutters that are ground flush to the apex of the cutting edge on one side of the jaws are often used. These flush-cutting pliers allow wires to be trimmed flush or nearly flush to a solder joint, avoiding the sharp tip left by symmetrical diagonal cutters. It is common for this type of diagonal cutter to be referred to by another name, such as flush cutter to distinguish it from symmetrical cutters.

For easier cutting of larger gauge wire, a compound action can be employed to increase the mechanical advantage.

Some pliers for electrical work are fitted with wire-cutter blades either built into the jaws or on the handles just below the pivot.

Other variations are made to create high leverage specifically to cut through hard wire, such as electrical fence wire, dental wire, and piano wire.

== Gallery ==
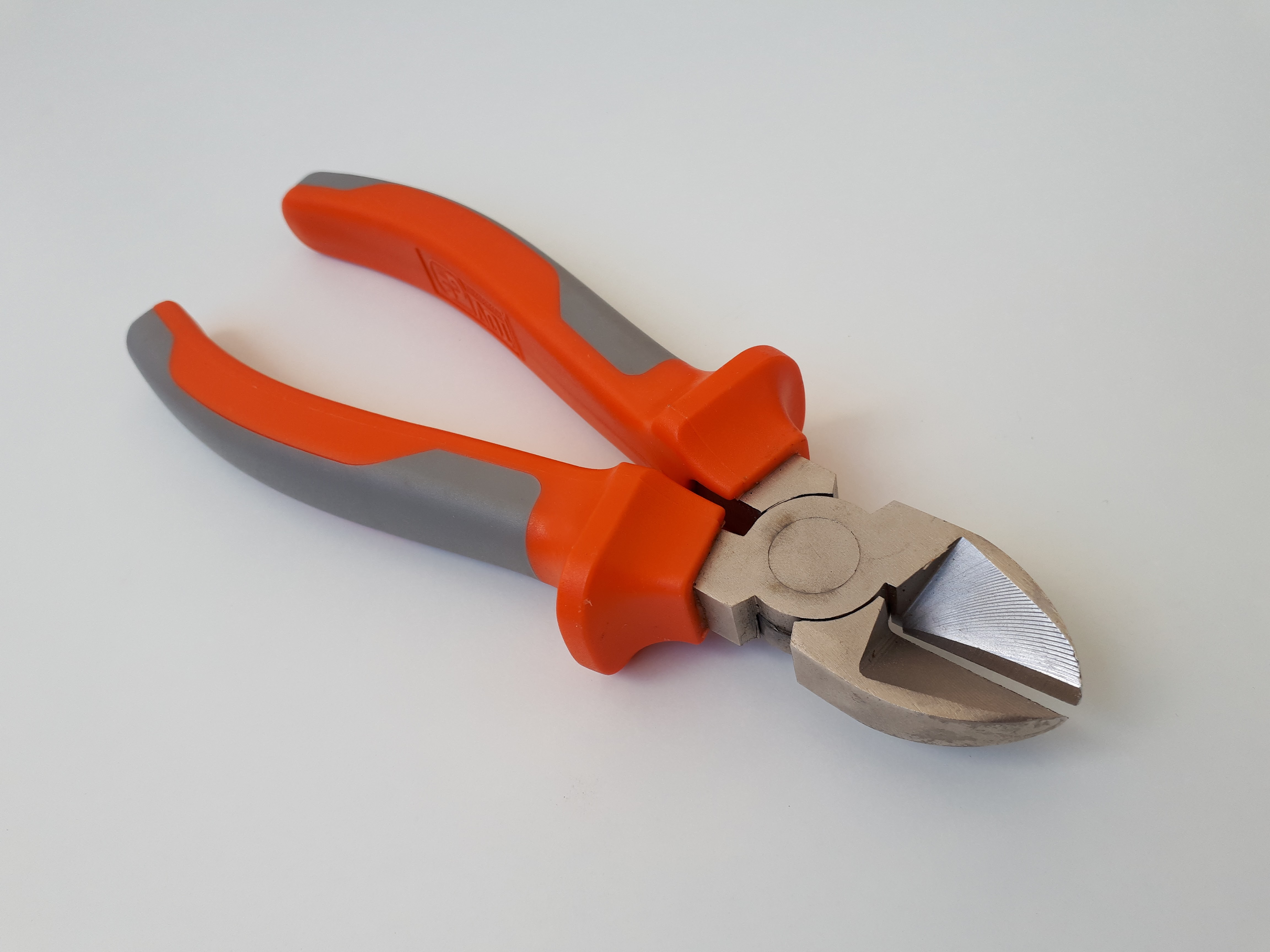

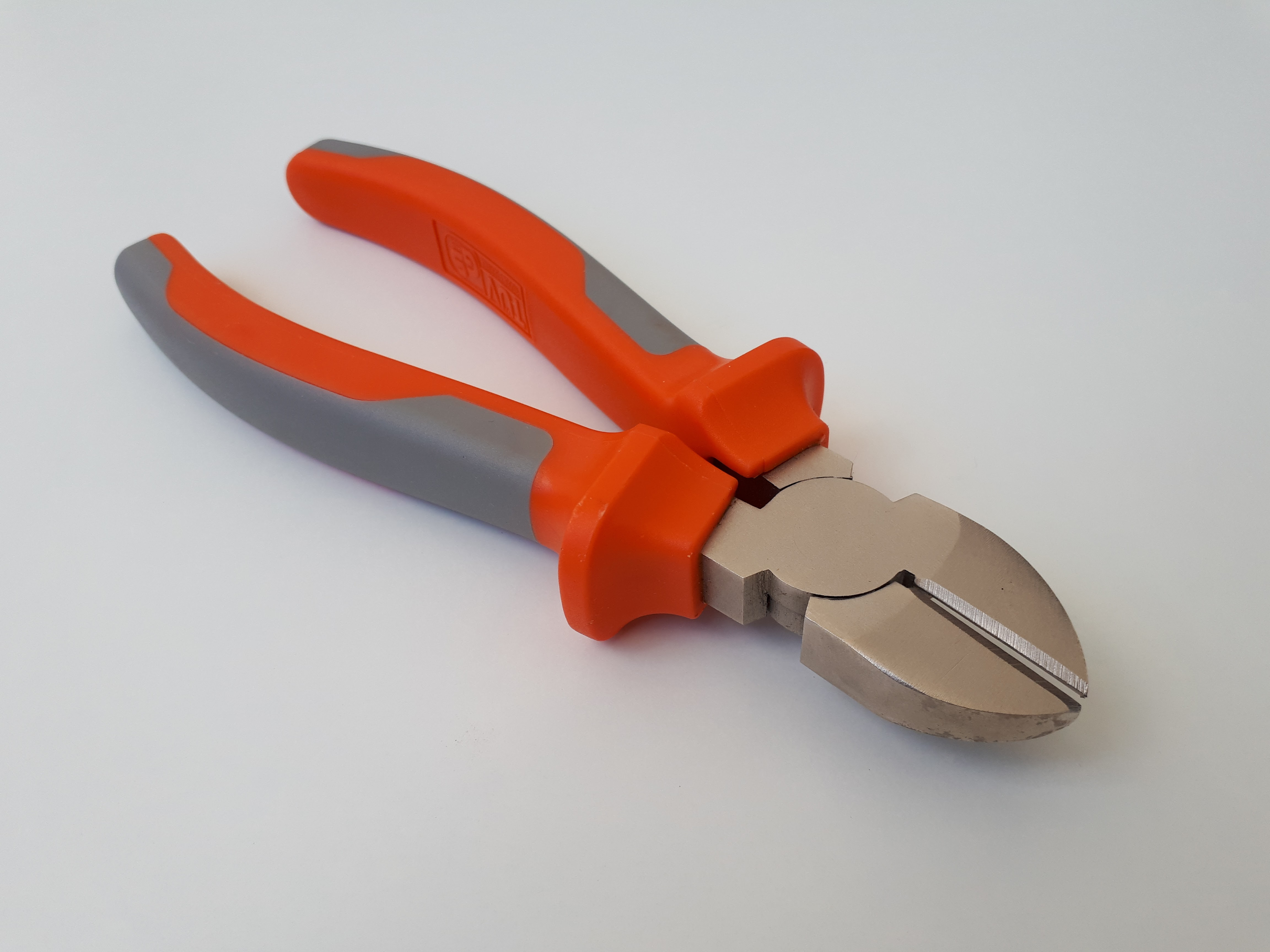

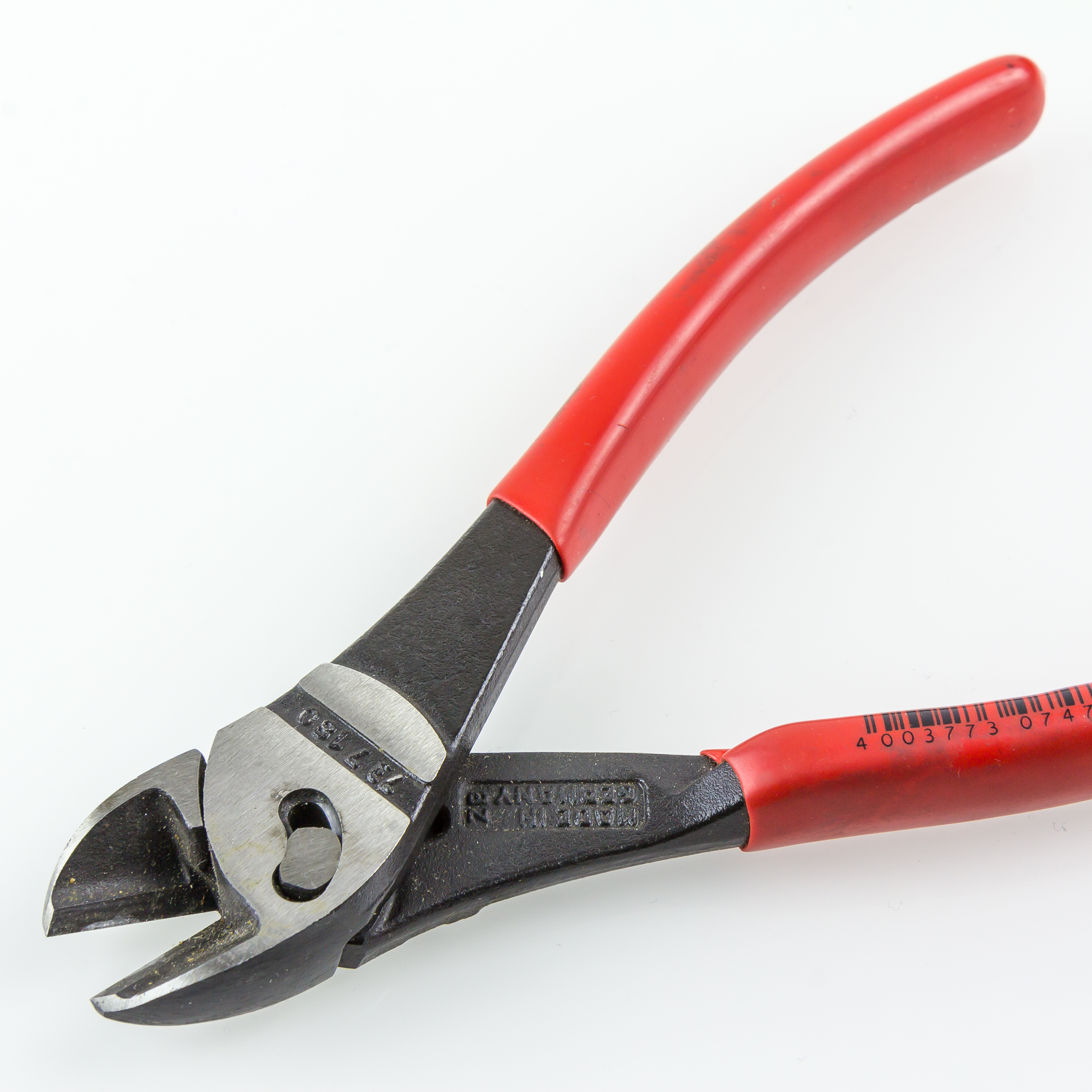

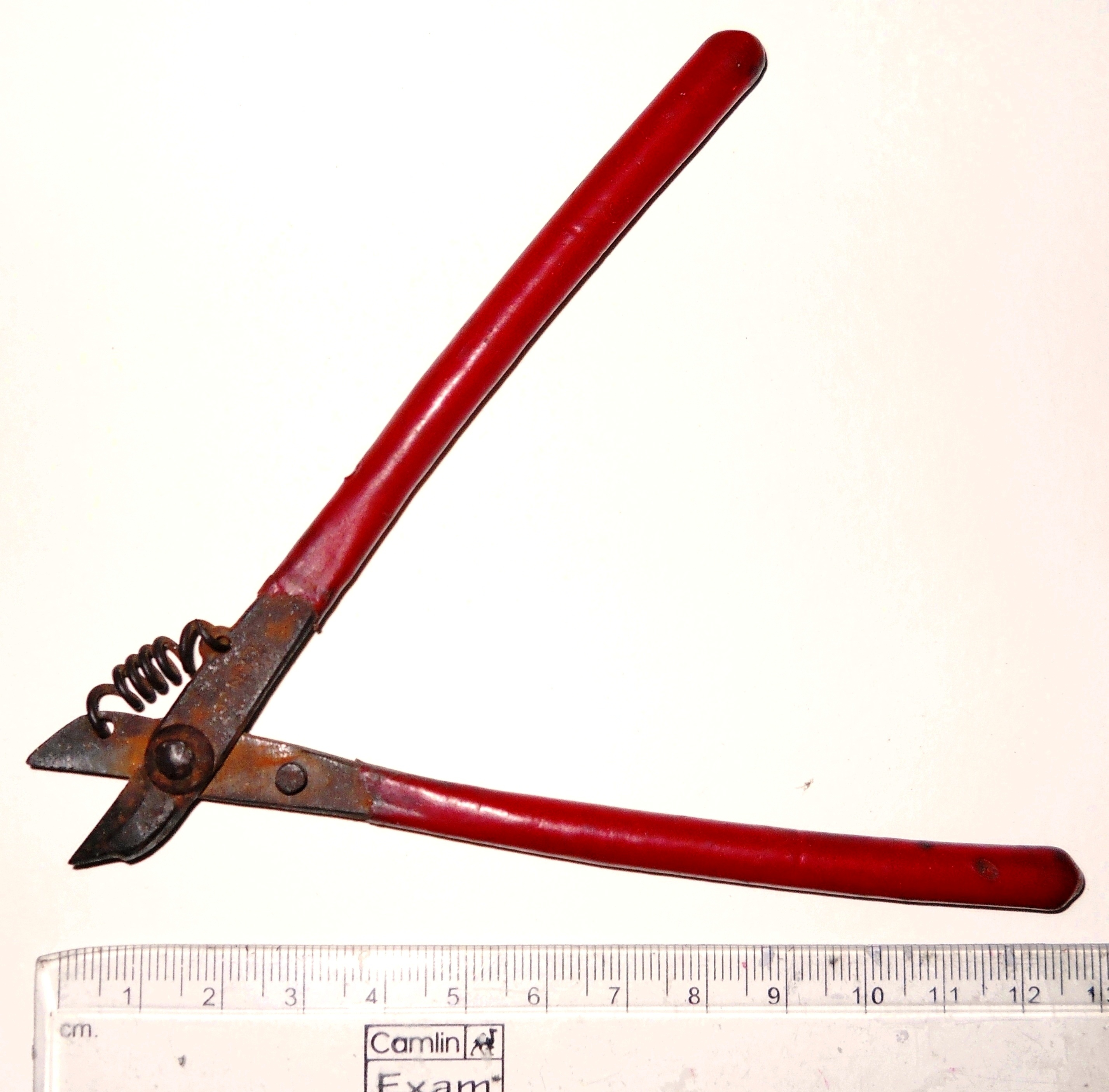
Wire cutting with a shearing action

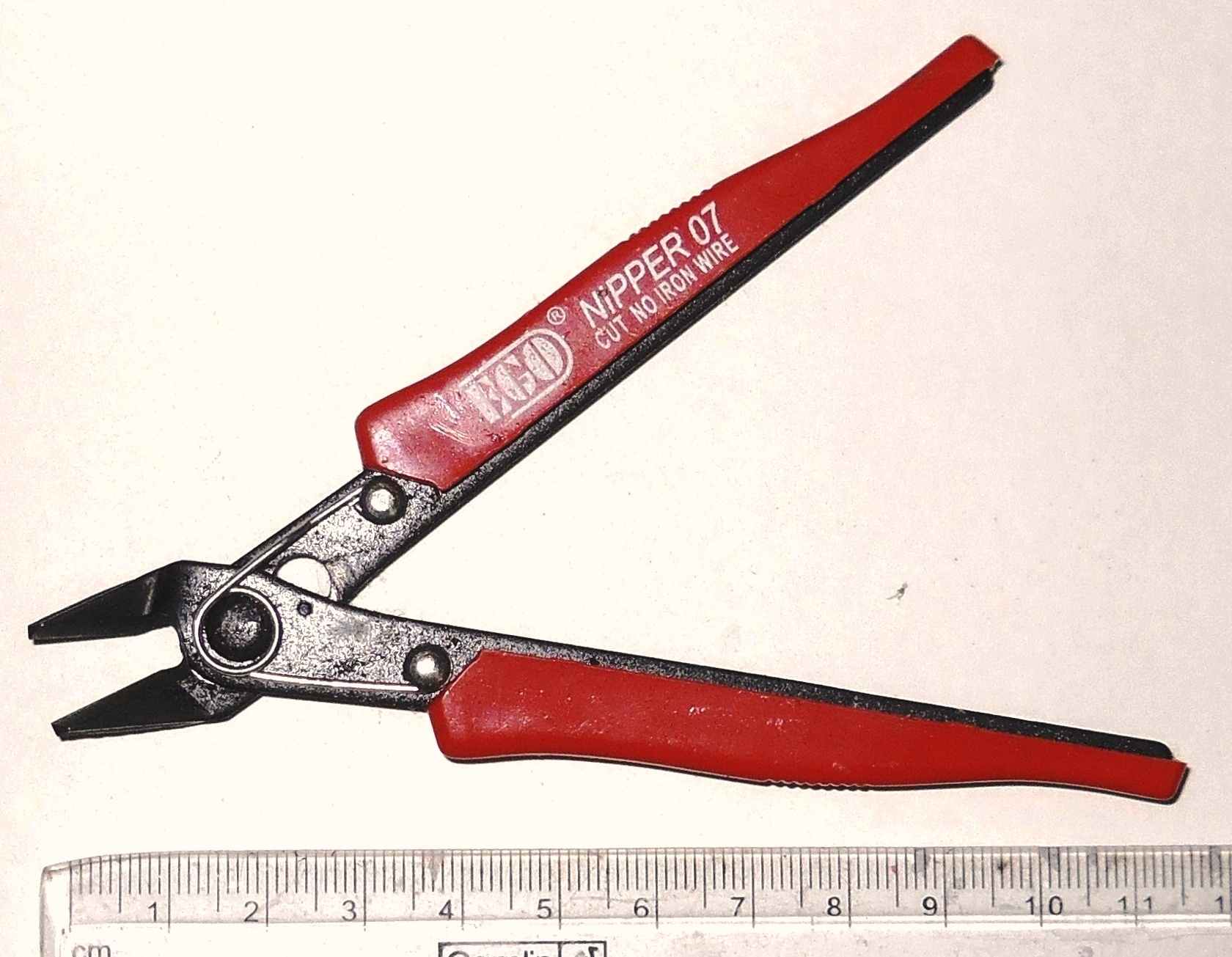
