= Car ramp =

Ramp for lifting a car from the ground

Sketch of a car ramp

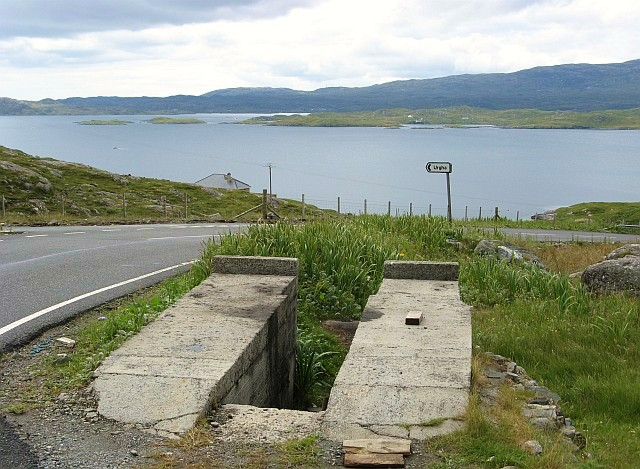
A horizontal concrete car ramp in Scotland

A car ramp is a structure or device used to raise an automobile from the ground in order to access its undercarriage. An alternative method to using a jack or jack stands. Car ramps are simple to use and relatively inexpensive. Car ramps also offer safety for mechanics by providing vehicle stability during car maintenance and repairs. Some ramp types can be built at home and hand-made with simple tools.

== Buyers guide ==
There are many different car and vehicle service ramps available today, and it is important to utilize one with the proper features and specifications for the job you are doing. Some important things to pay attention to when selecting a car ramp for personal use and at home maintenance are the weight limits/specifications, ground clearance, and general dimensions. When performing any at home maintenance on an automobile, safety is the first priority. If you plan on performing maintenance to a larger SUV or truck it may be worth considering purchasing car ramps made out of stainless steel. While not all stainless steel options will have higher weight limits, they will generally provide a more stable platform to perform maintenance. Regardless, you should always research the weight of your vehicle(s) to determine what strength ramp is required. Ground clearance, or how high up the ramp elevates a car, should also be considered. Smaller cars or sedans ride closer to the ground than larger vehicles and may require to be lifted higher for specific maintenance. On the contrary, if you are working in a vertically confined space it is important not to lift the car too high. Finally, you should ensure that the size of the ramps are suitable for the tire size of your vehicle. This is an important aspect of using car ramps as they are directed to ensure that the measured safety regulations are in place.

== See also ==
- Auto mechanic
- Automobile repair shop
- Car elevator
- Engine tuning
- Mechanical engineering
- Service (motor vehicle)
