= Podger spanner =

Construction wrench

A podger spanner, or podger, is a tool in the form of a short bar, usually tapered and often incorporating a wrench at one end.

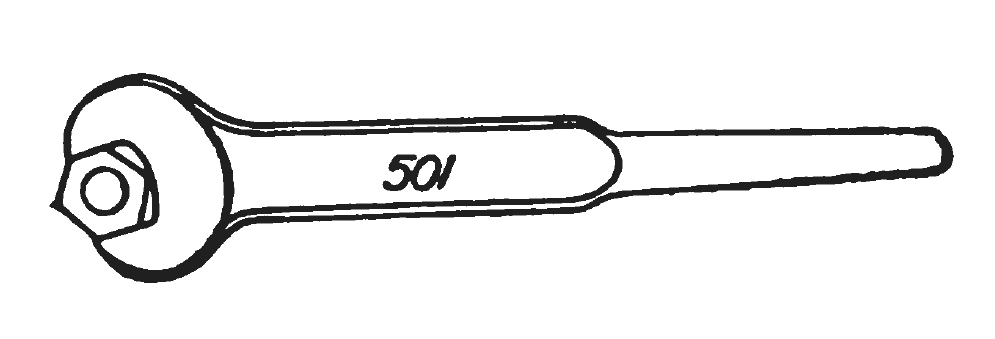
A podger spanner

Podgers are used for erecting scaffolding and steel scenery - The pointed end is used to align the bolt holes while the spanner end is used to tighten the nuts.

== Variations ==
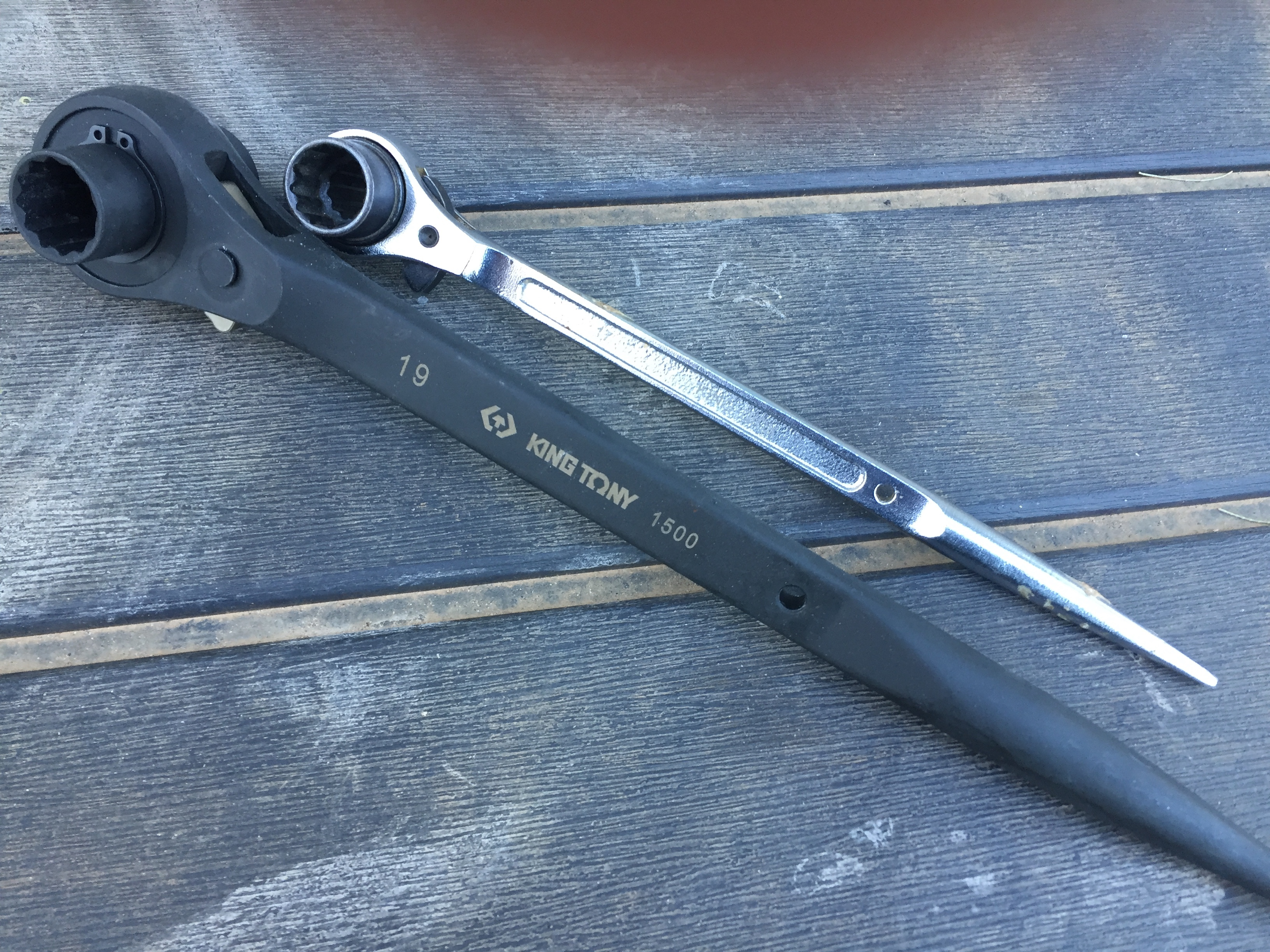
Ratchet podger spanners

Some podgers are fitted with reversible ratchet sockets for tightening/loosening nuts. Often they come with two sizes such as a 17 mm × 19 mm or a 19 mm × 24 mm and a 27 mm × 30 mm. Often a podger has a hole in the wrench shaft that is used to tether the wrench to the person for safety and securing the tool whilst working at heights.
