= Screed (disambiguation) =

In building construction, a screed is a tool, guide or material.

Screed may also refer to:

- Free floating screed, used to flatten asphalt paving
- Power concrete screed, used to smooth and level freshly poured concrete surfaces
- Screed wire, a ground wire in electrical work

== See also ==
- Scree, rock fragments at the base of a cliff
