= Barber-Greene =

Defunct American construction equipment company

Barber-Greene Company
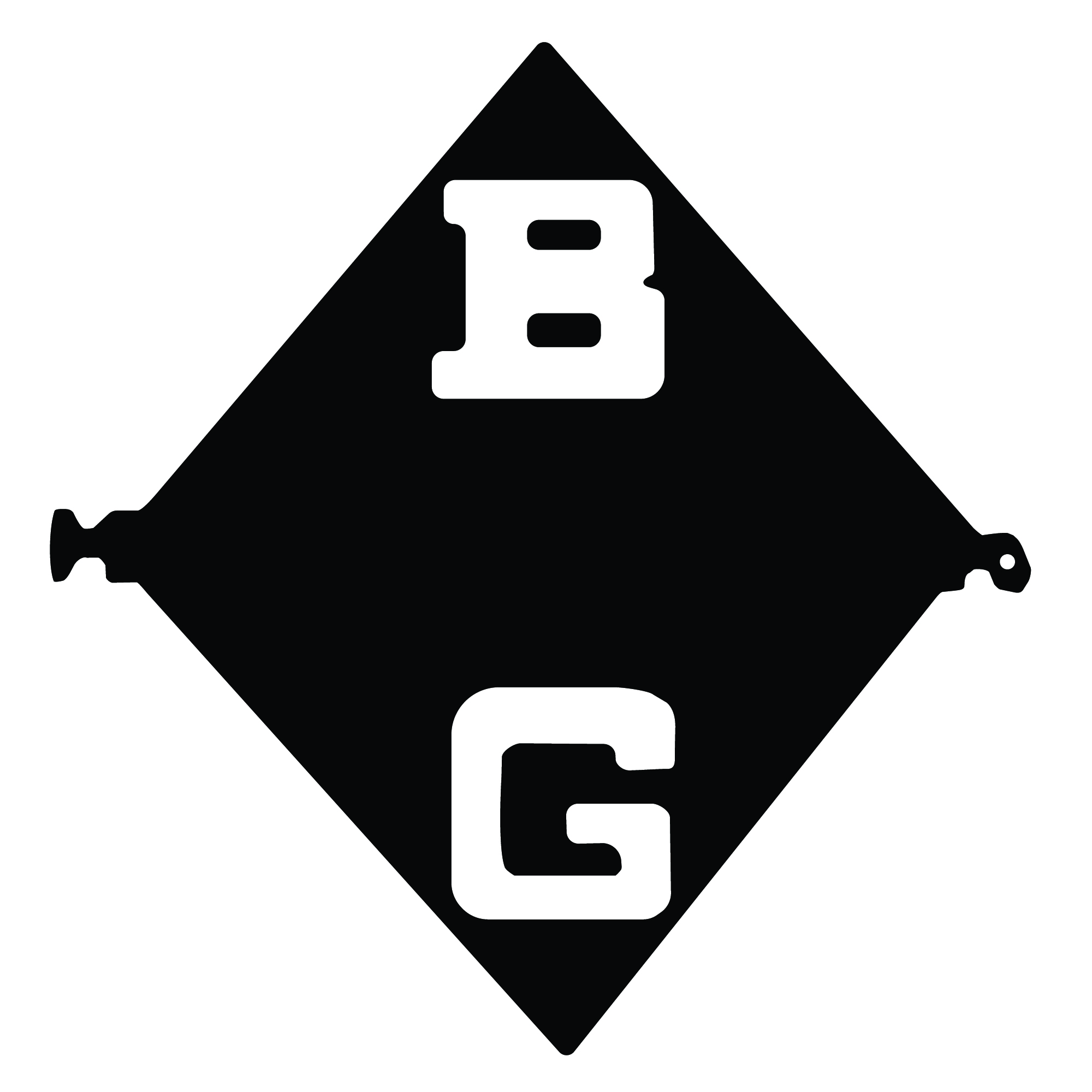
- Industry: Earth Movers, Asphalt
- Founded: 1916; 110 years ago in Aurora, Illinois, United States
- Founders: Harry H. Barber and William B. Greene
- Defunct: 1986
- Fate: Purchased by Astec Industries of Chattanooga, Tennessee in late 1986.
- Headquarters: Aurora, USA
- Products: Machinery

Barber-Greene Company was a company founded in 1916 by American mechanical engineers Harry H. Barber and William B. Greene. It was formed to sell standardized material-handling machines to mechanize small manual tasks in an economical way. Though the company began by offering conveyors and bucket loaders, it is best known for its contributions to the asphalt field. In 1959, the company went public and was sold to Astec in 1986.

== History ==
=== Early designs ===
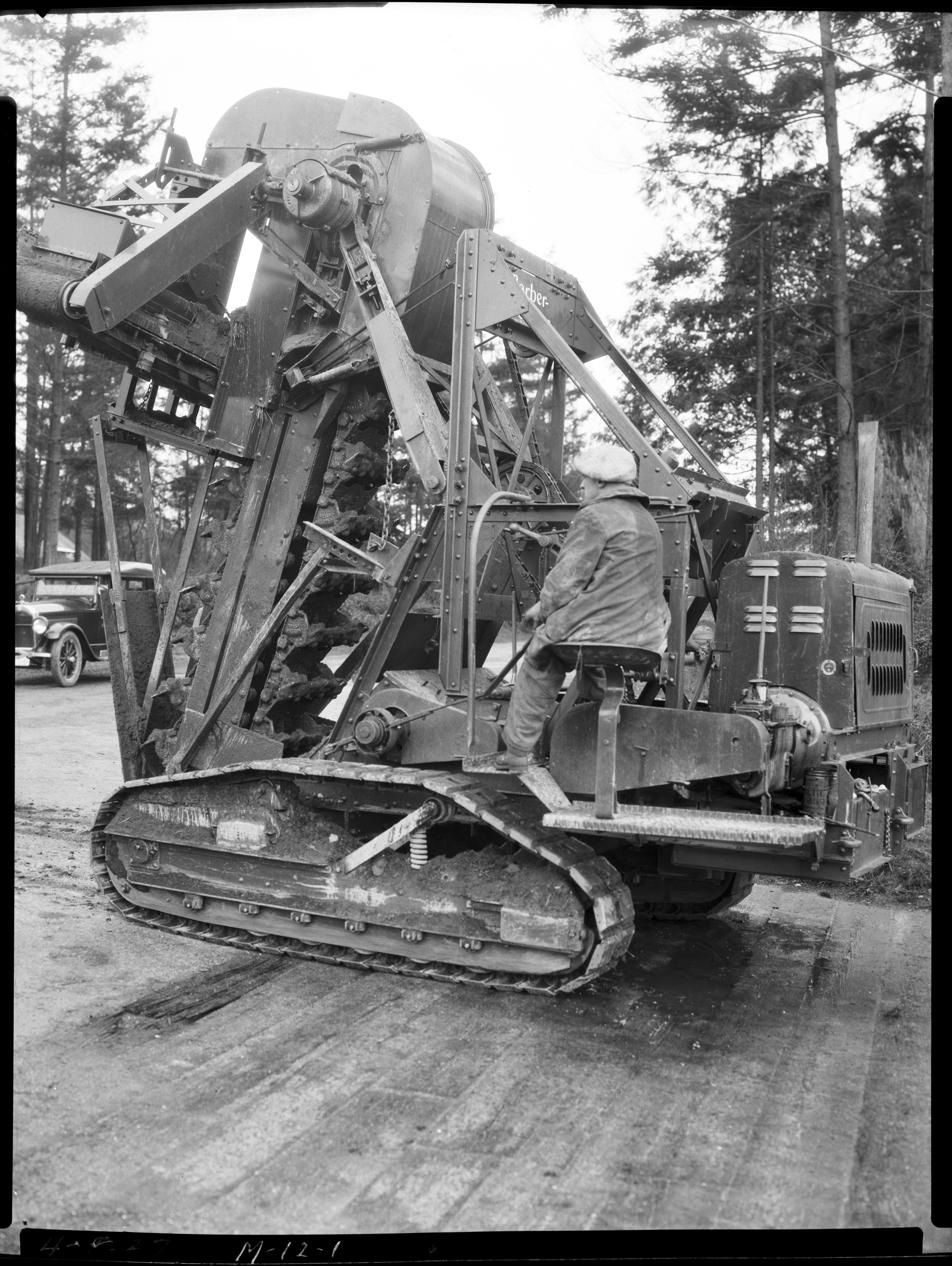
Barber-Greene 44c ditch digging machine, Seattle, Washington (1927)

Founded in 1916, Barber-Green focused its initial work on development and manufacturing of standardized conveyor components. They found early success with a bucket loader with a steep conveyor and discharge chute for loading trucks from material stockpiles. The launch of the Good Roads Movement garnered the company many customers looking to gather and weigh aggregates in proper proportions for concrete pavements. In 1922, the company launched a successful line ditching and trenching machines.

=== Asphalt paver ===
On November 15, 1930, in Aurora, Illinois, Harry Barber made a sketch of a new machine that became the asphalt paver. Harry asked patent attorney W.R. Chambers to examine this new machine. The patent was filed on August 20, 1932 with a publication date on December 22, 1936. This eventually became the beginning of the development of the modern asphalt paver. Today there is an entire industry that has been developed from this invention. The machine mixed and placed asphalt in a single operation. This was first exhibited at the 1931 Road Show in St. Louis. Barber realized that the mixing and placing operations needed to be separated, and the mixing section became the line of Barber Greene asphalt plants and the placing section became the Barber Greene paver line.

The early pavers used screw conveyors to distribute the mix in front of a screed that tamped the mix. This process meant that the asphalt was suitable for coarse-graded mixes. Dense-graded mixes that were common on city streets the machine experienced problems including surface imperfections. In 1933, Barber's son Ashley joined the company and in the same year the independent floating screed was developed. This screed, along with the tamper bar that permitted uniform material density of the finished surface were the two key features that made the machine successful. Early pavers had a hopper which material was dumped into and spread by an auger. The floating screed was supported by runners that traveled on the prepared base material.

On April 10, 1936, the U.S. Patent Office issued the initial patent number 2,138,828 "Machine for and process of laying roads", and on December 6, 1938, this patent was granted. By 1934, production had started on the model 79 paver which featured a feeder conveyor to move the material to the auger. In 1936, the 879 model was introduced. By 1940, this machine was upgraded to the 879-A Model. This machine was the standard asphalt paver around the world until the mid-1950s. These basic features that were introduced by Barber Greene have been incorporated into most asphalt pavers in use today (1987).

=== Company ===
Other Barber Greene firsts include:

- First synchronized tampers (1945)
- First paver on rubber crawlers (1958)
- First hydraulic paver (1959)
- First automatic screed control (1960)
- First hydrostatic paver (1970)

Barber-Greene products were licensed internationally under a number subsidiaries:

- Barber-Greene Americas
- Barber-Greene Canada
- Barber-Greene Olding (England)
- Barber-Greene Overseas

Barber-Greene also made a successful line of trenching machines, asphalt batch plants, asphalt drum mixing plants, and road recyclers called Dynaplanes.

== Dissolution ==
Barber-Greene shut down its manufacturing plant in Aurora, Illinois in 1985 and was later purchased by Astec Industries of Chattanooga, Tennessee in late 1986. The Barber-Greene headquarters in Aurora, Illinois was then sold to Transbulk Distribution Centers, Inc. for $2.9 million in 1987.

The Barber-Greene Co of DeKalb (which manufactured paving equipment) was purchased by Caterpillar Inc. for approximately $25 million in 1991.

== Models ==
Barber-Greene Pavers

- 79, 879, 879A
- 873, SB30, SB41, SB50, SB110, SB111, SB121, SB131, SB140, SB170
- SA35, SA41, SA145, SA150, SA190
- BG210, BG210B, BG270
- BG220, BG240, BG260
- BG220B, BG240B, BG260B
- BG225, BG245, BG265
- BG225B, BG245B, BG265B
- BG610H, BG650
- BG240C, BG260C,
- BG225C, BG245C, BG2455C,
- 700 Road Widener, 710 Road Widener

Barber-Greene Profilers

- RX20, RX30, RX40B, RX50, RX80, RX80B

== Gallery ==
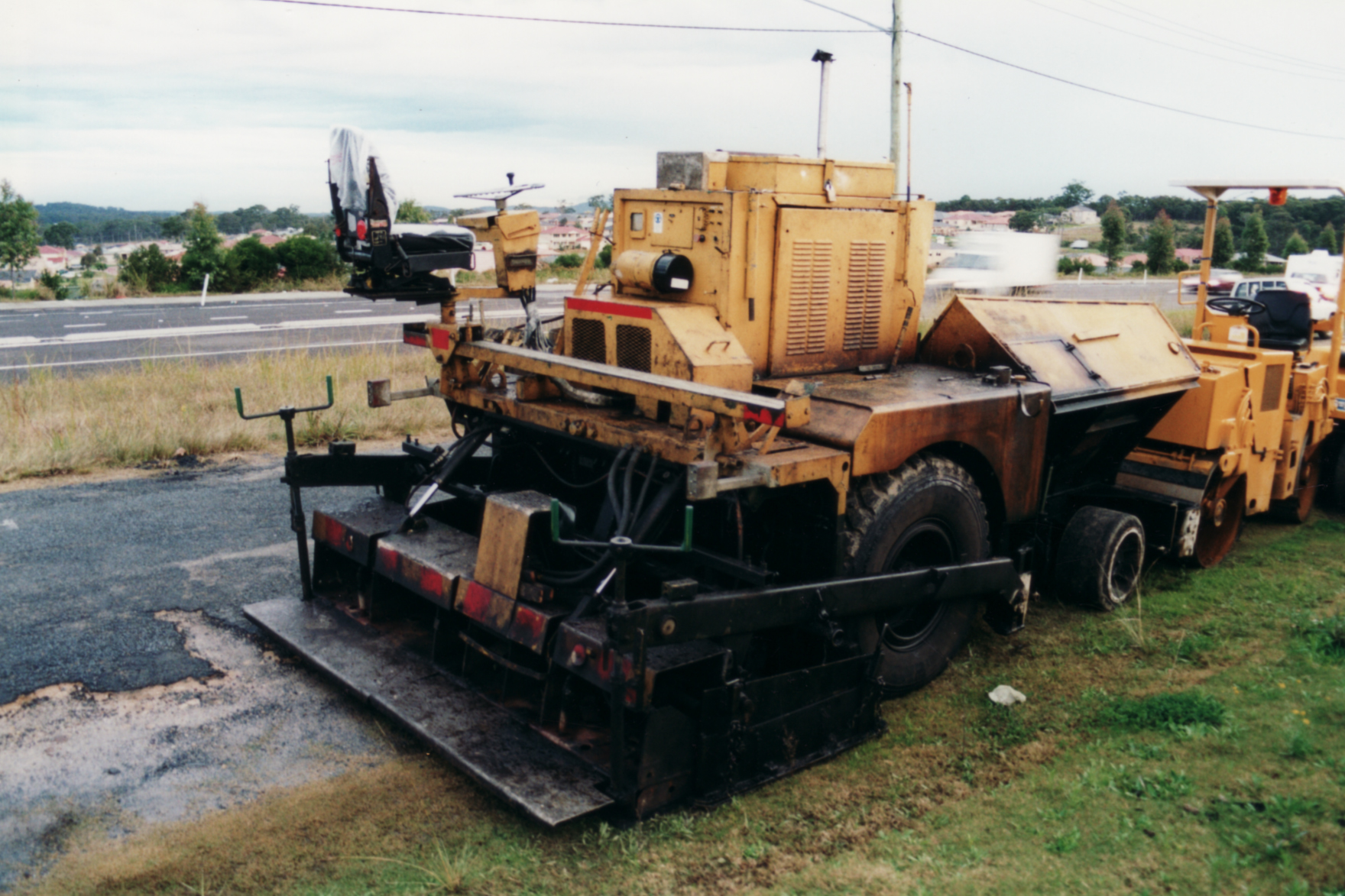
A Barber Greene Paver

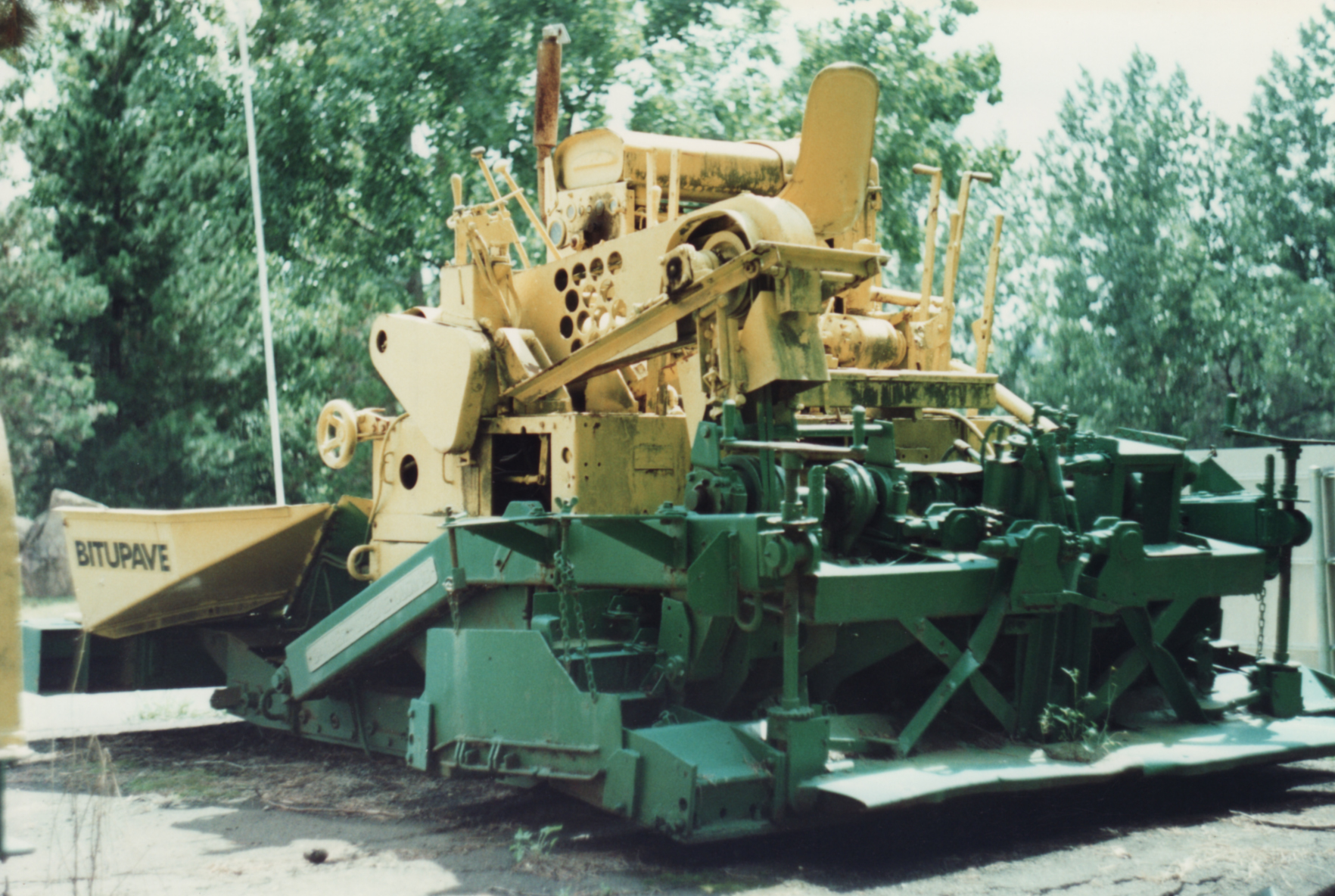
Barber Greene 879 paver

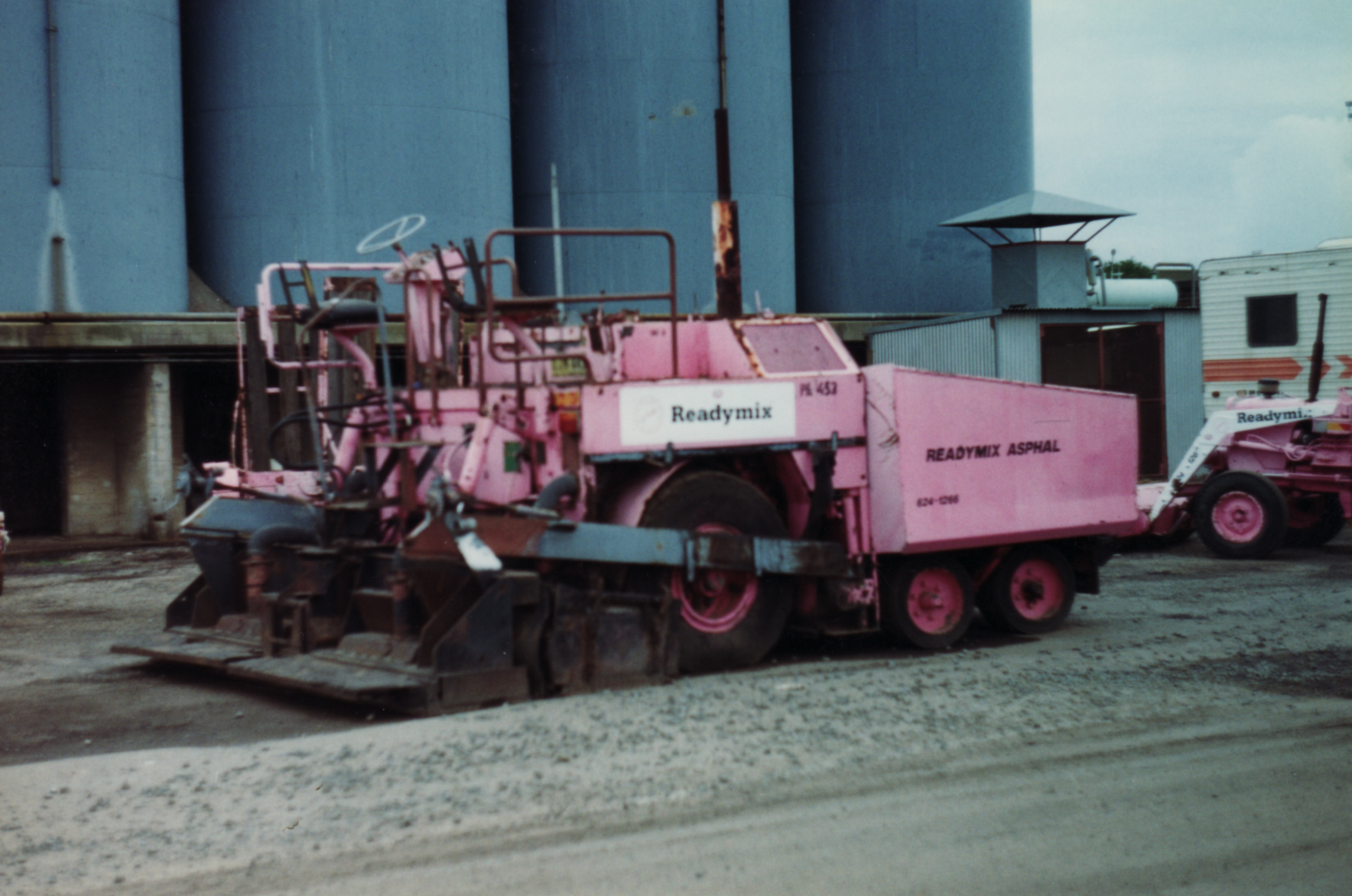
Barber Greene SB131 Paver

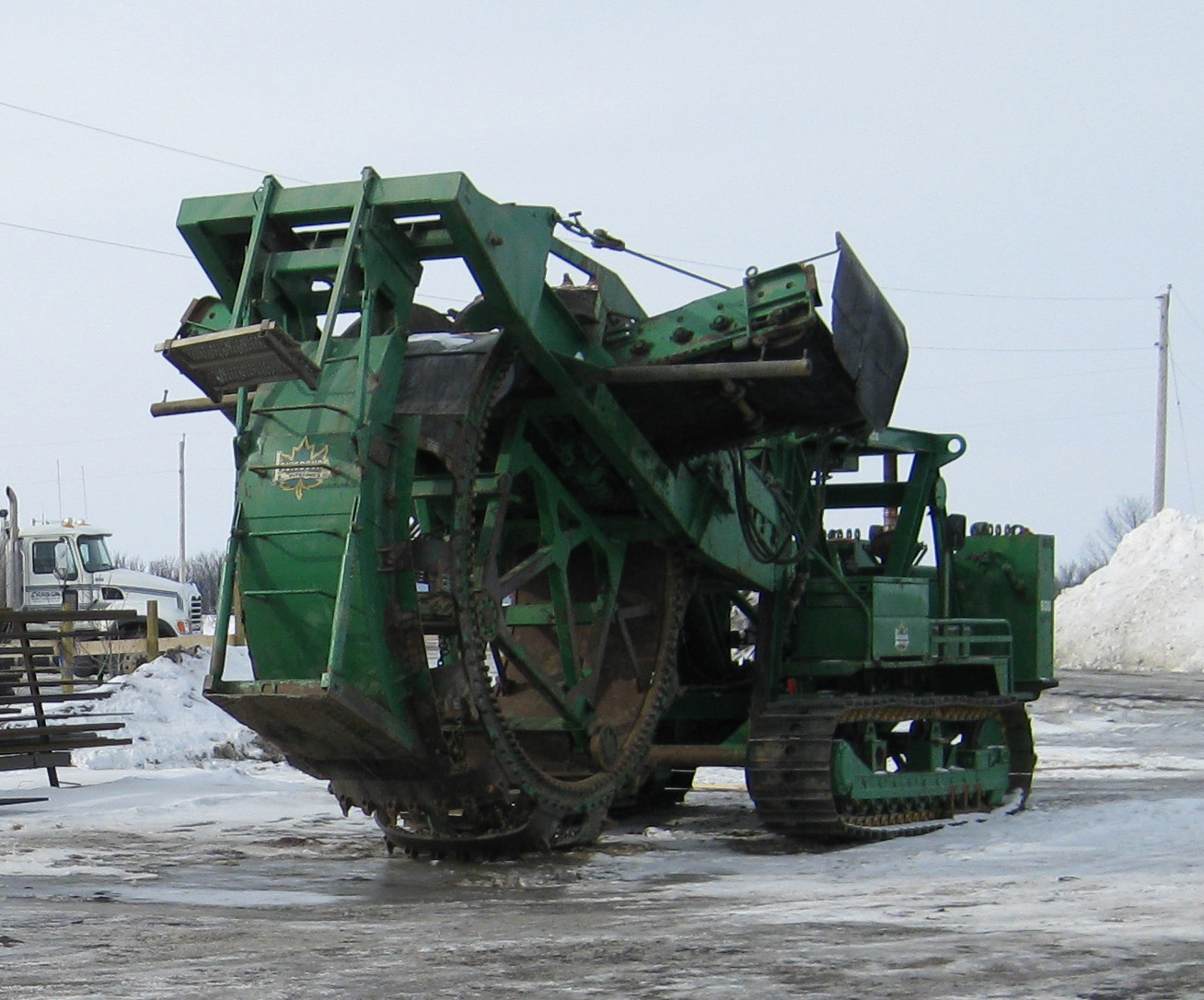
Barber Greene Ditcher
