= Paver (vehicle) =

Construction equipment used to lay asphalt

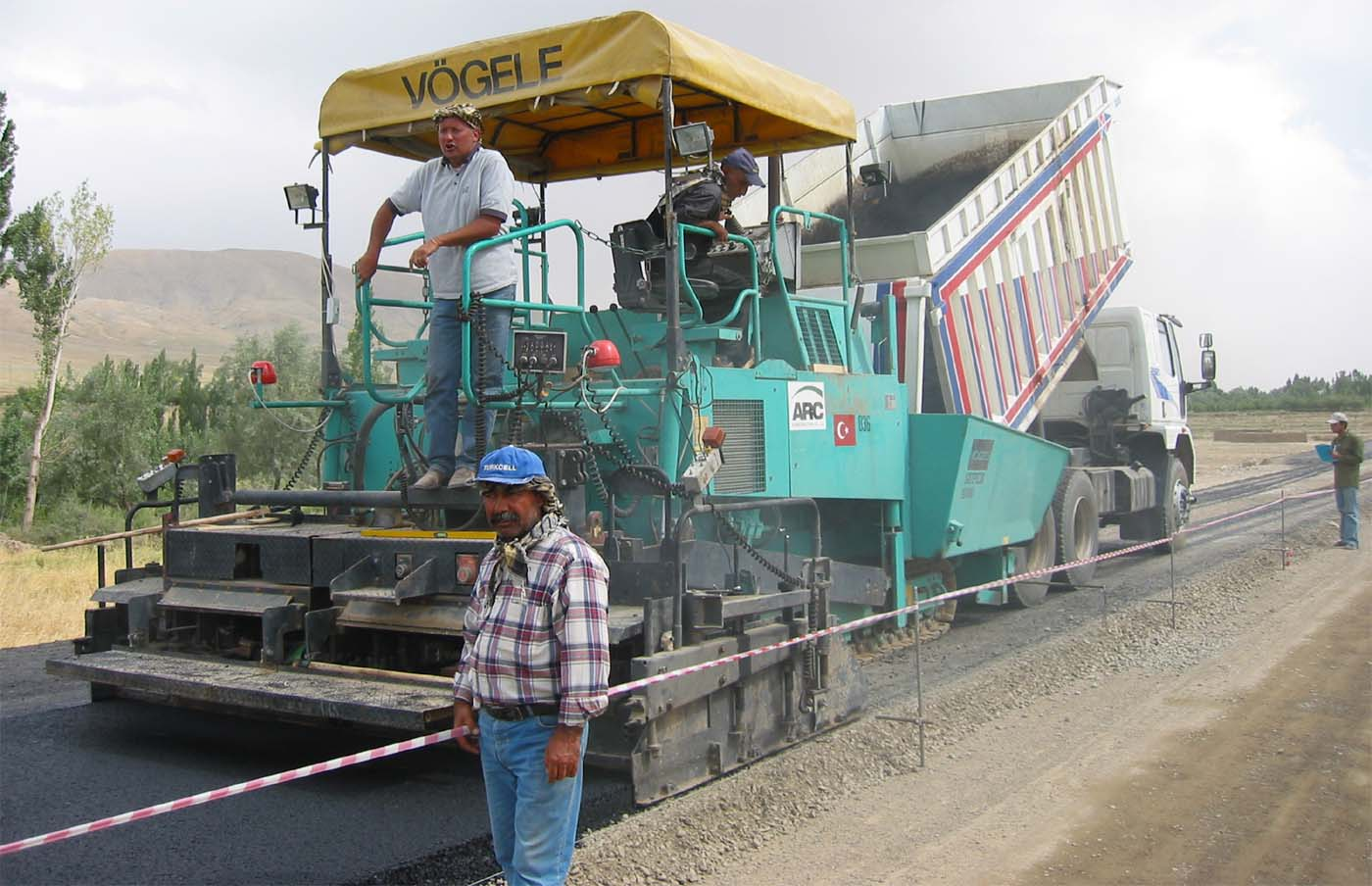
Machine laying asphalt concrete, fed by a dump truck.

A paver (road paver finisher, asphalt finisher, road paving machine) is a piece of construction equipment used to lay asphalt concrete or Portland cement concrete on roads, bridges, parking lots and other such places. It lays the material flat and provides minor compaction. This is typically followed by final compaction by a road roller.

== History ==
The asphalt paver was developed by Harry Barber of the Barber Greene Co., that originally manufactured material handling systems. In 1929 the Chicago Testing Laboratory approached them to use their material loaders to construct asphalt roads. This did not result in a partnership but Barber did develop a machine based on the concrete pavers of the day that mixed and placed the concrete in a single process. This setup did not prove as effective as desired and the processes were separated and the modern paver was on its way. In 1933 the independent float screed was invented and when combined with the tamper bar provided for uniform material density and thickness. Barber filed for a patent a "Machine for and process of laying roads" on 10 April 1936 and received patent U.S. patent 2,138,828 on 6 December 1938. The main features of the paver developed by the Barber-Greene have been incorporated into most pavers since, although improvements have been made to control of the machine.

== Operation ==
The asphalt is added from a dump truck or a material transfer unit into the paver's hopper. The conveyor then carries the asphalt from the hopper to the auger. The auger places a stockpile of material in front of the screed. The screed takes the stockpile of material and spreads it over the width of the road and provides initial compaction.

The paver should provide a smooth uniform surface behind the screed. In order to provide a smooth surface a free floating screed is used. It is towed at the end of a long arm which reduces the base topology effect on the final surface. The height of the screed is controlled by a number of factors including the attack angle of the screed, weight and vibration of the screed, the material head and the towing force.

To conform to the elevation changes for the final grade of the road modern pavers use automatic screed controls, which generally control the screed's angle of attack from information gathered from a grade sensor. Additional controls are used to correct the slope, crown or superelevation of the finished pavement.

In order to provide a smooth surface the paver should proceed at a constant speed and have a consistent stockpile of material in front of the screed. Increase in material stockpile or paver speed will cause the screed to rise resulting in more asphalt being placed therefore a thicker mat of asphalt and an uneven final surface. Alternatively a decrease in material or a drop in speed will cause the screed to fall and the mat to be thinner.

The need for constant speed and material supply is one of the reasons for using a material transfer unit in combination with a paver. A material transfer unit allows for constant material feed to the paver without contact, providing a better end surface. When a dump truck is used to fill the hopper of the paver, it can make contact with the paver or cause it to change speed and affect the screed height.

== Portland cement concrete paving ==
Large freeways are often paved with Portland cement concrete and this is done using a slipform paver. Trucks dump loads of readymix concrete in heaps along in front of this machine and then the slipform paver spreads the concrete out and levels it off using a screed.

== Gallery ==
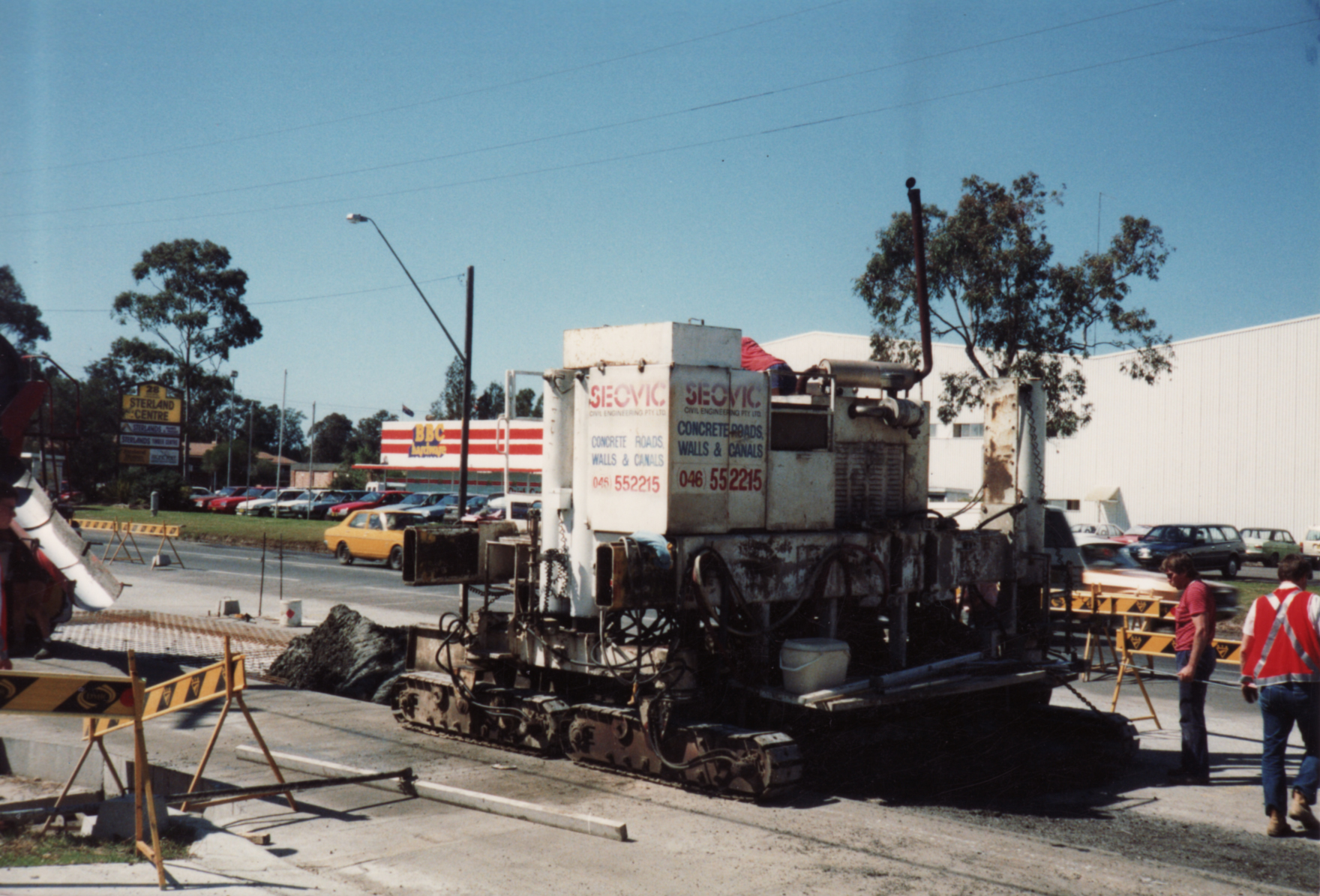
A small concrete road paver called a "slipform paver"

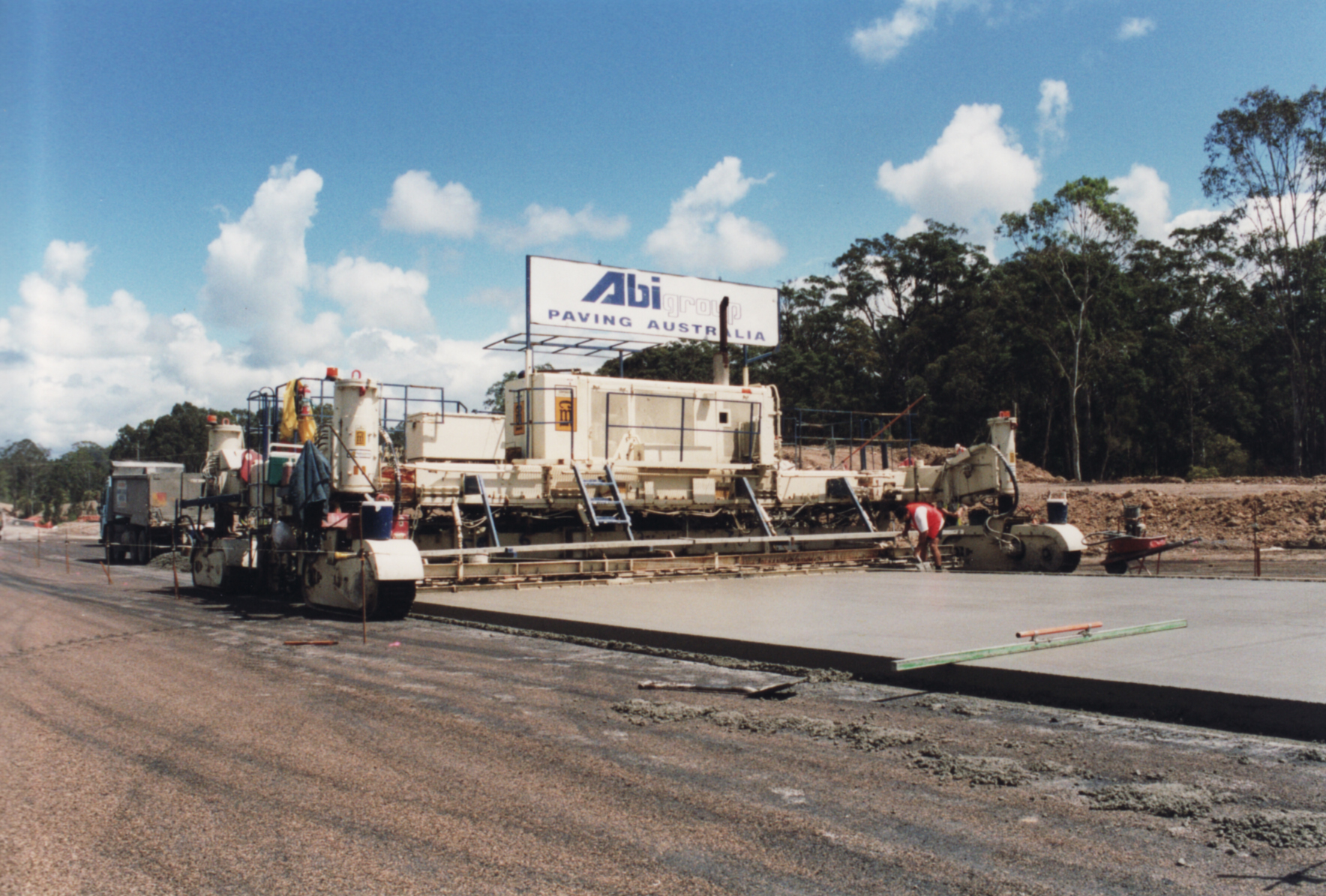
A large concrete slipform road paver

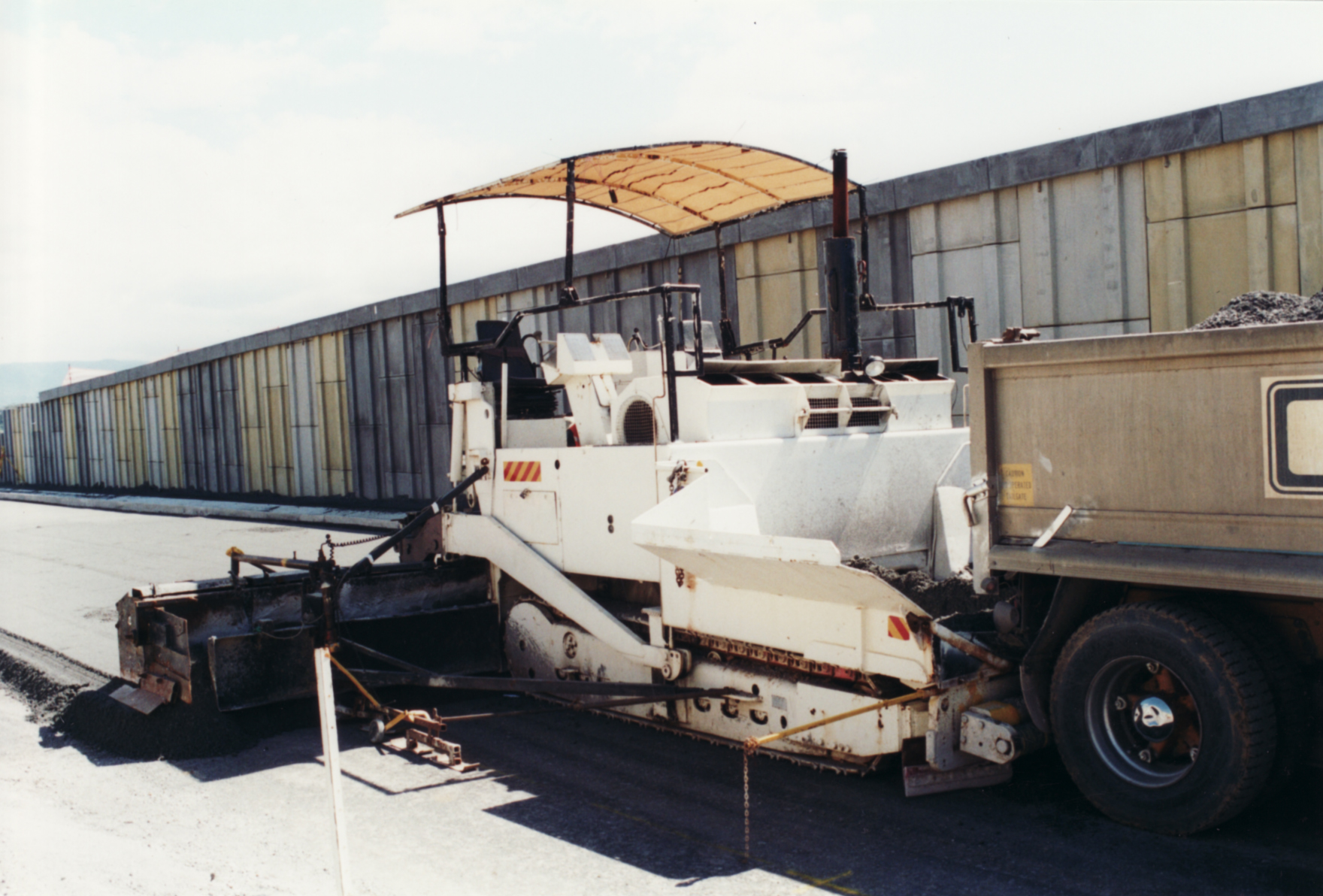
An asphalt paving machine being used to lay the "road base course" this is the layer of rocks under the asphalt.

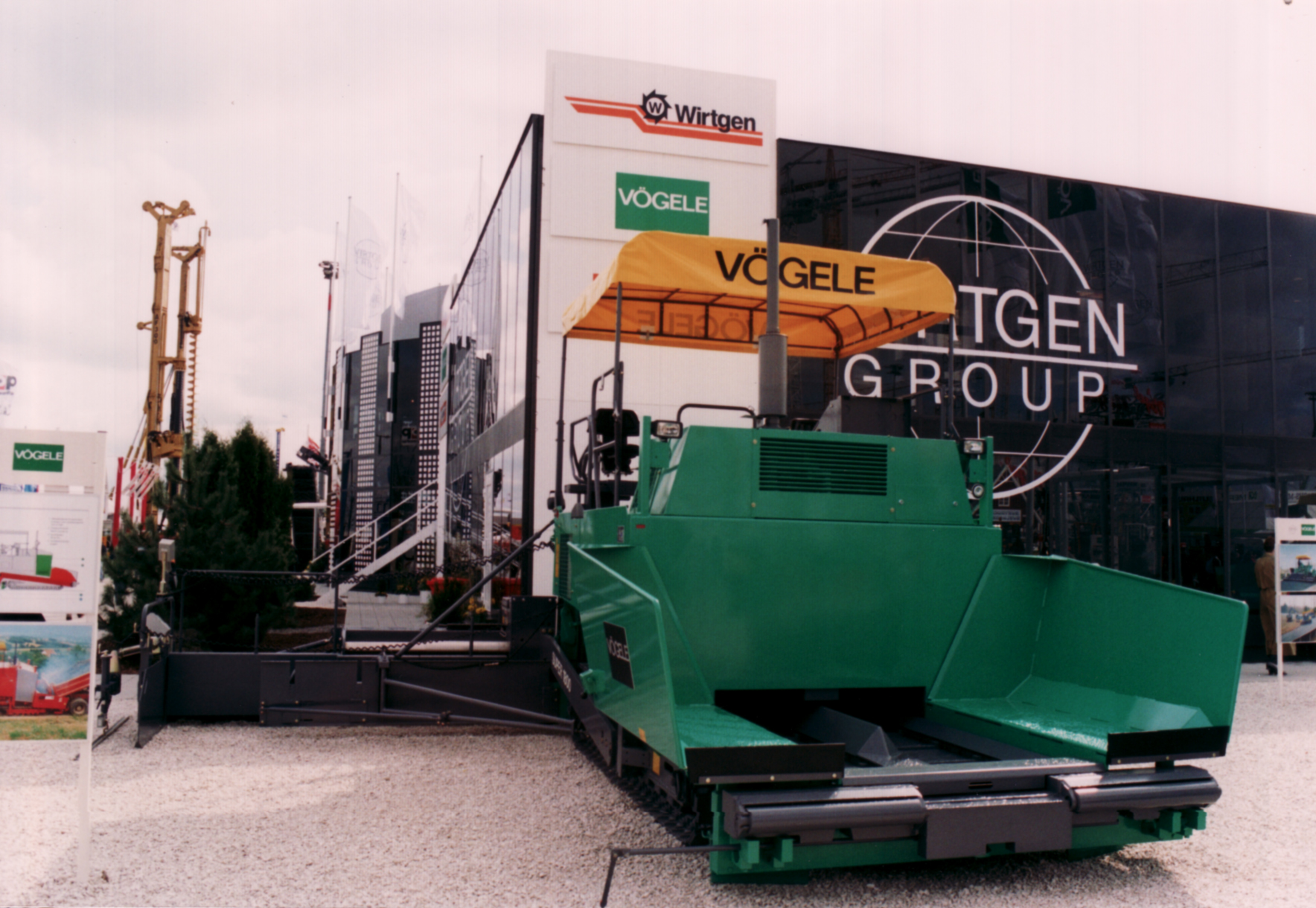
A road paver. The rollers at the front push the truck along while unloading. The slat conveyor in the middle drags the asphalt to the back.

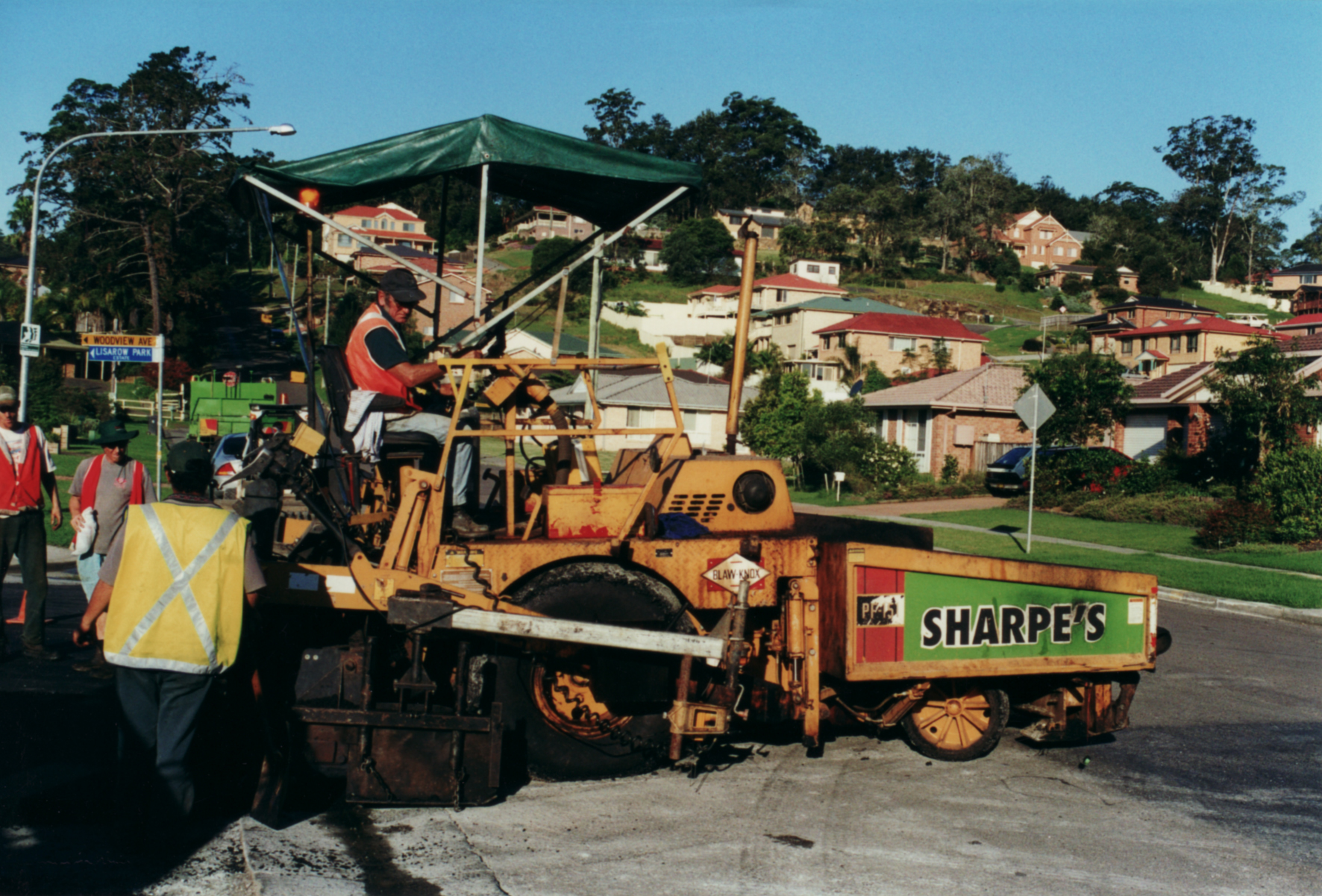
Asphalt pavers can be on wheels or tracks. Here is a small Blaw Knox wheel type paver on a residential street job.

== See also ==
- Road building
- Civil engineering
