= Robert J. Roberts =

English-American body builder (1849 – 1920)

Photograph of Robert J._Roberts, Courtesy of Springfield College, Archives and Special Collections

Robert J. Roberts (1849 – December 22, 1920) was a bodybuilder who was born in England and moved to the United States when young. Roberts served as superintendent of the Boston YMCA gymnasium and was in active service up to within a few days of his death. Roberts was a pioneer of physical training by experimenting on himself. Because of his clearly defined physique, Roberts was often a model for artists and sculptors. He was the first physical director to train men for health instead of for purely athletic events.

In 1876, Roberts was appointed as superintendent of the Boston YMCA gymnasium. In 1877, he was hurt by a fall from a swing in the gymnasium, and while on his back for many weeks formed the plans for making exercise in a gym "safe, easy, short, beneficial and pleasing". This was regarded as a complete revolution from the heavy, dangerous and difficult gymnasium work of the past. In a few years he attracted the attention of scientific men to what he called "body building". He introduced open-air work and many indoor features, such as mats for wrestling, indoor running tracks and the ring shower. Another feature for which he was famous was his dumbbell drill, which has since been adopted widely.

Roberts died on the afternoon of December 22, 1920 at his home, 12 Carlisle Street, Roxbury.

Roberts was a devout Baptist.
