= Concrete float =

Tool used to smooth a concrete surface

A concrete float is a tool used to finish a concrete surface by making it smooth. A float is used after the surface has been made level using a screed. In addition to removing surface imperfections, floating will compact the concrete as preparation for further steps.

A float can be a small hand tool, a larger bull float with a long handle, or a power trowel (also called a power float) with an engine. Concrete floats are generally made of magnesium, aluminum, or wood.

== Gallery ==
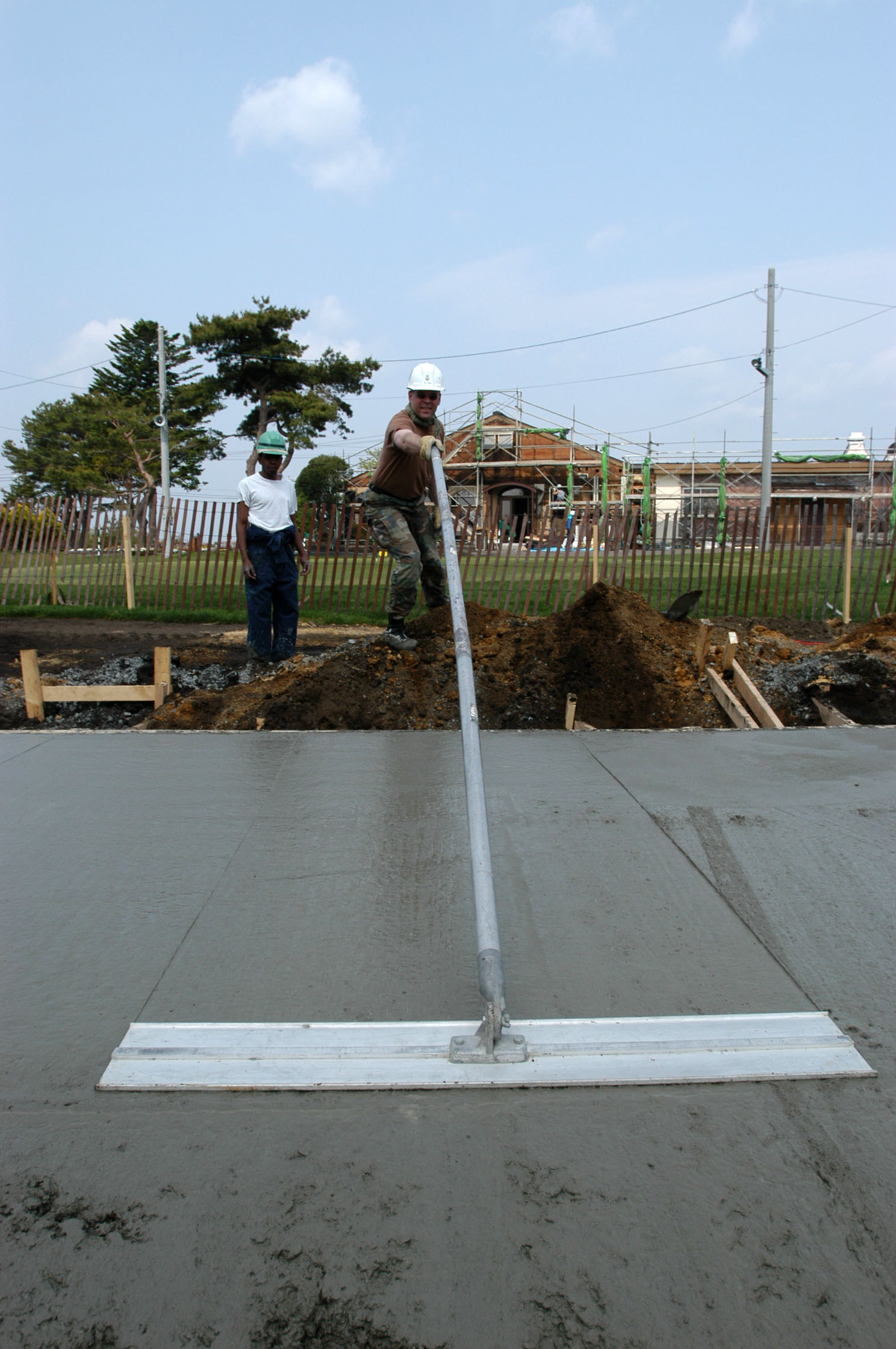
Smoothing concrete with a large concrete float, or bull float

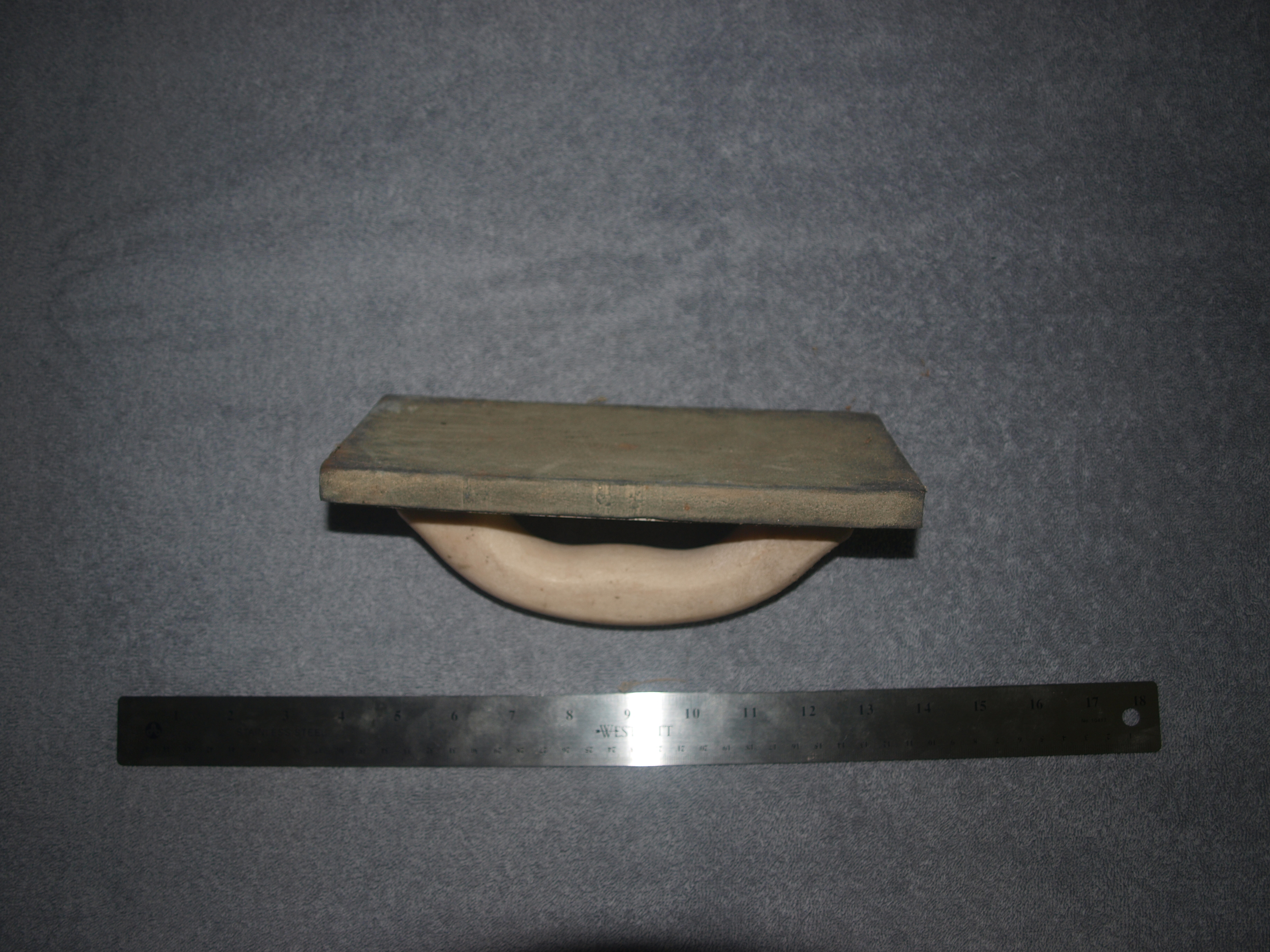
Hand float for concrete (upside down)
