= Trencher (machine) =

Construction equipment

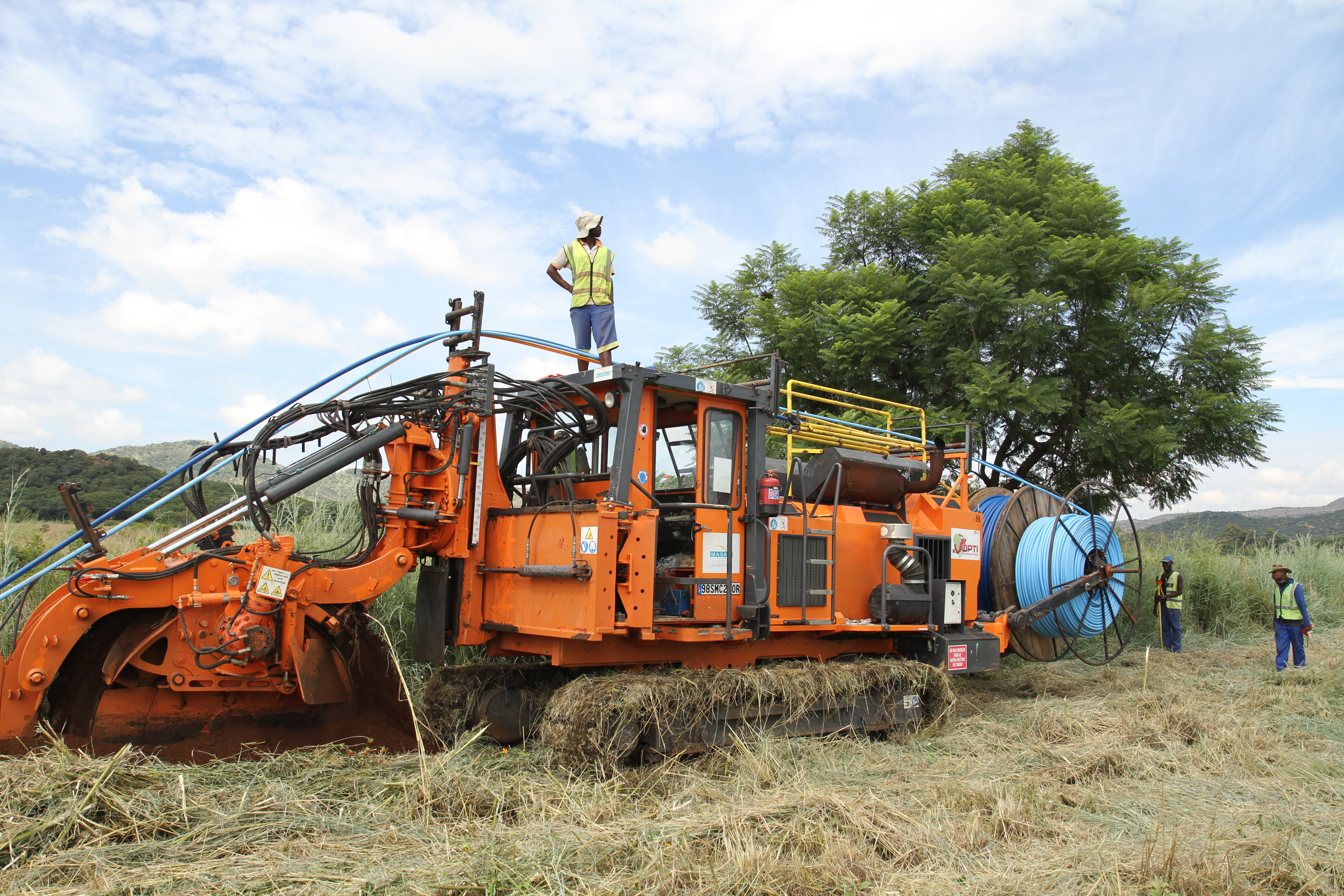
A wheel trencher in South Africa

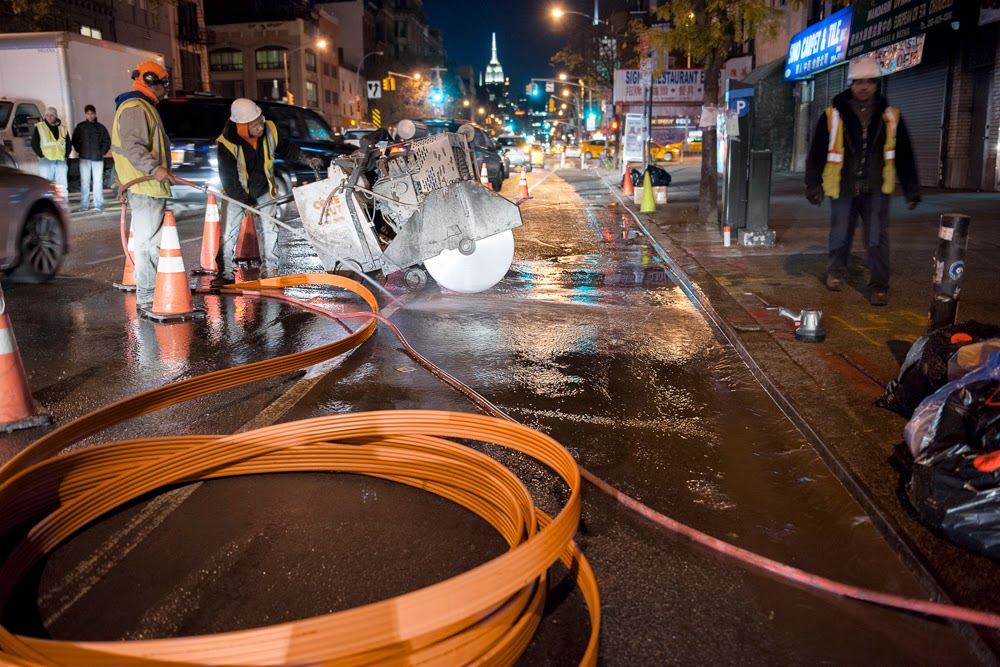
Stealth Communications' Microtrenching in Chinatown (Manhattan), for installing fiber optic cables in microducts

A trencher is a piece of construction equipment used to dig trenches, especially for laying pipes or electrical cables, for installing drainage, or in preparation for trench warfare. Trenchers may range in size from walk-behind models, to attachments for a skid loader or tractor, to very heavy tracked heavy equipment.

== Types ==
Trenchers come in different sizes and may use different digging implements, depending on the required width and depth of the trench and the hardness of the surface to be cut.

=== Wheel trencher ===
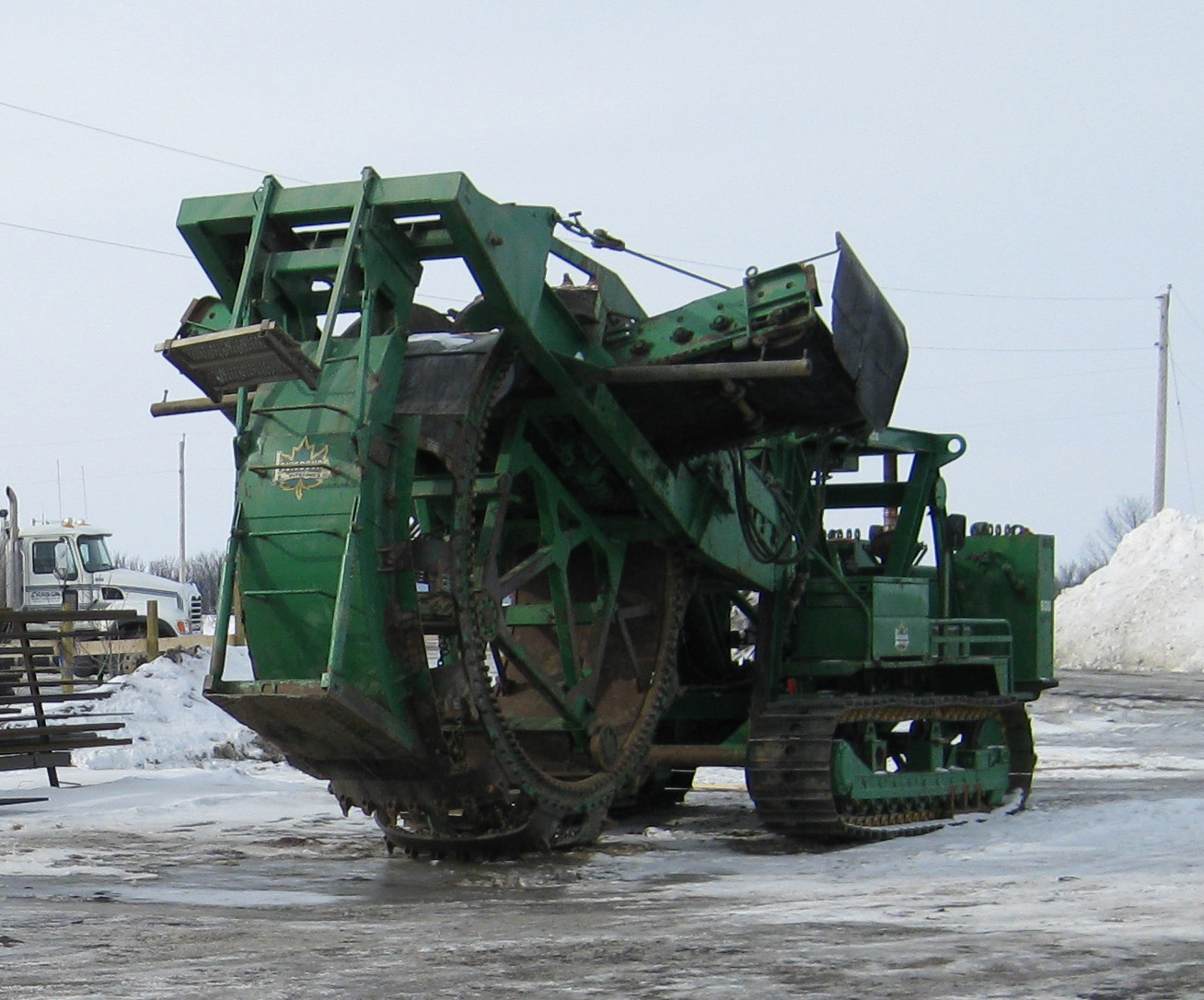
A Barber-Greene trencher. Barber-Greene is a division of Caterpillar.

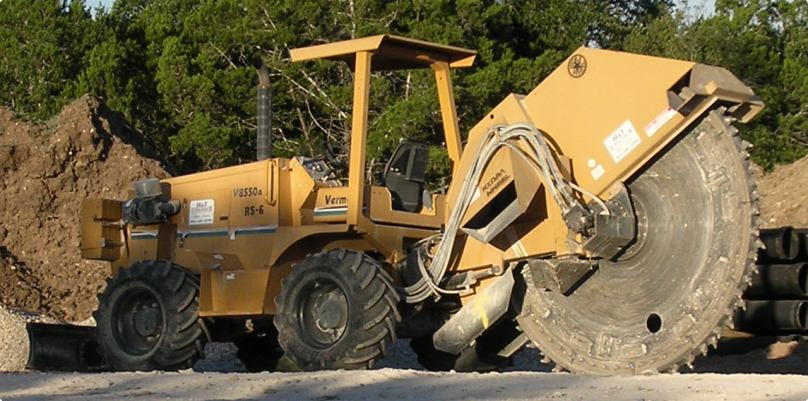
A rockwheel

A wheel trencher or rockwheel has a toothed metal wheel. It is cheaper to operate and maintain than chain-type trenchers. It can work in hard or soft soils, either homogeneous (compact rocks, silts, sands) or heterogeneous (split or broken rock, alluvia, moraines). This is particularly true because a cutting wheel works by clearing the soil as a bucket-wheel does, rather than like a rasp (chain trencher). Consequently, it will be less sensitive to the presence of blocks in the soil. They are also used to cut pavement for road maintenance and to gain access to utilities under roads.

Due to its design the wheel may reach variable cutting depths with the same tool, and can keep a constant soil working angle with a relatively small wheel diameter (which reduces the weight and therefore the pressure to the ground, and the height of the unit for transport).

The cutting elements (six to eight, depending on the diameter) are placed around the wheel, and bear the teeth which are more or less dense depending on the ground they will encounter. These tools can be easily changed manually, and adjusted to allow different cutting widths on the same wheel. The teeth are placed in a semi-spherical configuration to increase the removal of the materials from the trench. The teeth are made of high strength steel (HSLA steel, tool steel or high speed steel) or cemented carbide. When the machine is under heavy use, the teeth may need to be replaced frequently, even daily.

A system of spacers and ejectors allows the excavated materials to be moved away from the edges of the trench to avoid possible “recycling”.

Wheel trenchers may be mounted on tracks or rubber tires.

=== Chain trencher ===
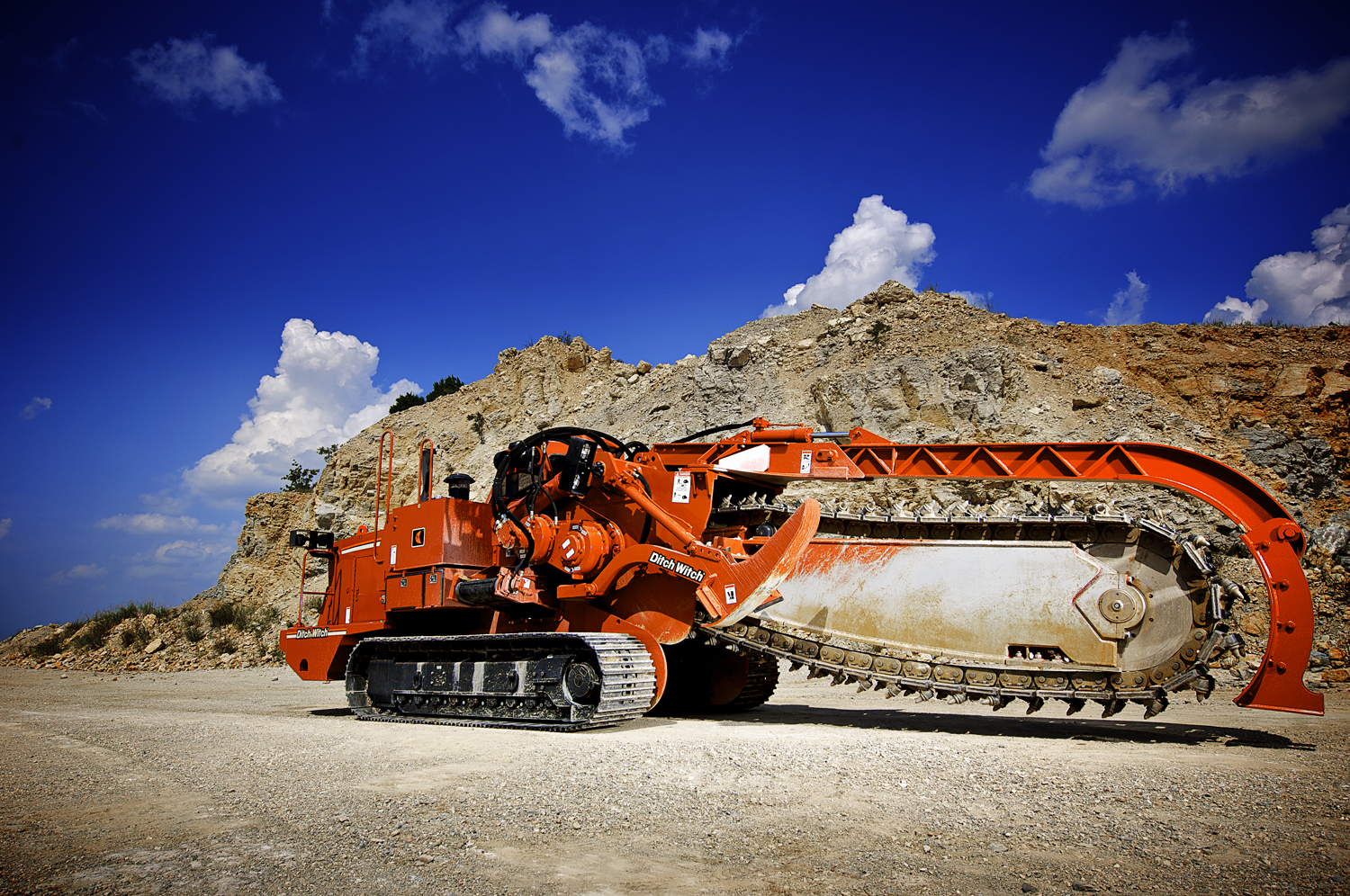
A track trencher with a digging chain

A chain trencher cuts with a digging chain or belt that is driven around a rounded metal frame, or boom which resembles a giant chainsaw. This type of trencher can cut ground that is too hard to cut with a bucket-type excavator, and can also cut narrow and deep trenches. The angle of the boom can be adjusted to control the depth of the cut. To cut a trench, the boom is held at a fixed angle while the machine creeps slowly.

The chain trencher is used for digging wider trenches (telecommunication, electricity, drainage, water, gas, sanitation, etc.) especially in rural areas. The excavated materials can be removed by conveyor belt reversible either on the right or on the left side.

There are various methods for excavating trenches in rock – principally drill and blast, hydraulic breakers and chain trenchers. Selection of a trench excavation method must take into account a range of rock and machine properties. It is suggested that the advantages of using chain trenchers in suitable rock outweigh the limitations and may have cost benefits and fewer adverse environmental effects compared with alternative methods.

=== Micro trencher ===
A micro trencher is a "small rockwheel" specially designed for work in urban areas. It is fitted with a cutting wheel that cuts a microtrench with smaller dimensions than can be achieved with conventional trench digging equipment. Microtrench widths range from about 30 to 130 mm (1.2 to 5.1 in) with a depth of 500 mm (20 in) or less. These machines are sometimes radio-controlled.

With a micro trencher, the structure of the road is maintained and there is no associated damage to the road. Owing to the reduced trench size, the volume of waste material excavated is also reduced. Micro trenchers are used to minimize traffic or pedestrian disturbance during network laying. For this reason they are often used to install lines such as fiber optic cables in public spaces. A micro trencher can work on sidewalks or in narrow streets of cities, and can cut harder ground than a chain trencher, including cutting through solid stone. They are also used to cut pavement for road maintenance and to gain access to utilities under roads.

=== Portable trencher ===
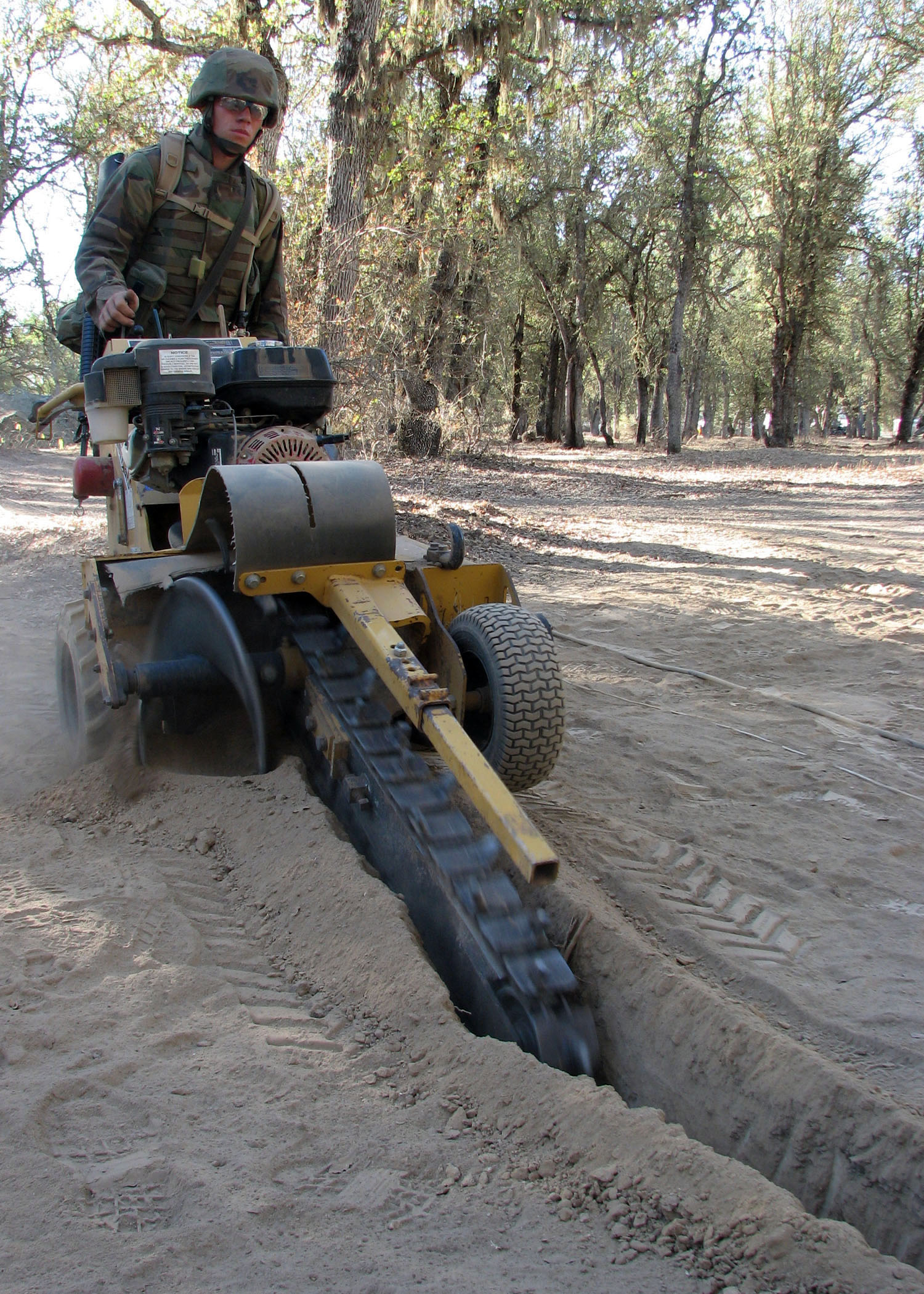
A portable assault trencher machine in operation

Landscapers and lawn care specialist may use a portable trencher to install landscape edging and irrigation lines. These machines are lightweight (around 200 pounds) and are easily maneuverable compared to other types of trenchers. The cutting implement may be a chain or a blade similar to a rotary lawn mower blade oriented so that it rotates in a vertical plane.

Another portable type are handheld trenchers that look similar to a chainsaw, weigh 20Kg (45lbs) or less, and can trench 0-700 mm (0-27 inches ) deep and a minimum of 50 mm (2 inches) wide.

=== Tractor-mount trencher ===
A tractor-mount trencher is a device which needs a creeping gear tractor to operate. This is another type of chain trencher. The tractor should be able to go as slowly as the trencher's trenching speed.

In August 2023, tractor-mounted trenchers were revealed to be in use by the Ukrainian Ground Forces to dig trenches at a rapid pace. The Ukrainians were reportedly using these to secure the territory they captured in their 2023 counteroffensive.

== Applications ==
A trencher may be combined with a drainage pipe or geotextile feeder unit and backfiller, so drain or textile may be placed and the trench filled in one pass.

== See also ==
- Bucket-wheel excavator, a larger cousin of the trencher.
- Plate compactor, a type of trench compactor.
