= Personal hovercraft =

Type of hovercraft

A personal hovercraft is a small hovercraft normally carrying fewer than 10 passengers. The low cost makes it affordable for personal use.

== Introduction ==
A hovercraft, or air-cushion vehicle, is a vehicle or craft that can be supported by a cushion of air ejected downwards against a surface close below it, and can in principle travel over any relatively smooth surface, such as gently sloping land, water, or marshland, while having no substantial contact with it. In Europe, the HSC2000 regulation craft less one Ton(1000 kg) for a personal hovercraft.

== Types ==
=== Race craft ===
Race craft are built for speed. They are mostly built from light materials to maximize speed but safety is often compromised. People who build race craft often participate in hovercraft races. The world's first hovercraft race was held on March 14, 1964 in Canberra, capital of Australia. There were 13 participants and around 10,000 spectators.

=== Self-built craft ===
Self-built hovercraft are ideal for hobbyists and for people for whom price is the main criterion. They can be self-designed craft, built from a plan or they can be kit-built craft. A kit can cost as little as $600 for a one-person craft, up to $5000 or more for a larger craft. Depending on the manufacturer a kit may be complete or almost complete. Most kits include engines. Alternatively a hovercraft can be built from scratch. Many plans can be found online so all you need do is buy your materials. Generally, racing hovercraft are provided with a high-RPM motor fan at the backside of the hovercraft for the required thrust. The racing hovercraft's height is limited to provide it stability even at high speeds.

=== Leisure craft ===
Leisure craft are oriented for ease of use and safety. They have higher buoyancy and are intended to be safe on the water even with engine off. The companies mostly professionally build leisure craft. There are several companies which offer already completed leisure craft. Hovercraft are weight dependent vehicles, so whereas race hovercraft are extremely lightweight, leisure hovercraft manufacturers need to also consider durability and longevity of product life. The majority of leisure hovercraft are constructed from glass fibre, with recent introductions of other materials such as HDPE (High Density Polyethylene). Leisure hovercraft designs offer better on-water handling capabilities - some hovercraft struggle to get onto the air cushion when starting on water, because hovercraft create a bow wave referred to as The Hump - so different models will have quoted on-water payloads to denote what weight can be lifted when starting from on-water. Some hovercraft have a tendency to nose dive or plough (plow) into water so some leisure suppliers offer anti-plough designs. Leisure hovercraft need better underside protection than perhaps you would find on a race craft - for leisure, think durability, for race, think speed. More powerful engines add weight, so suppliers need to consider many aspects to balance performance, durability, speed.

=== Personal hovercraft from the 1970s ===
This appeared in an early 1970s episode of Let's Make a Deal. This is an Air Cycle 720 made by Air Cushion Vehicles of Troy, New York valued at $1,495 at the time. It could go up to 40 MPH.

== See also ==
- Power trowel
