= Power trowel =

Piece of light construction equipment

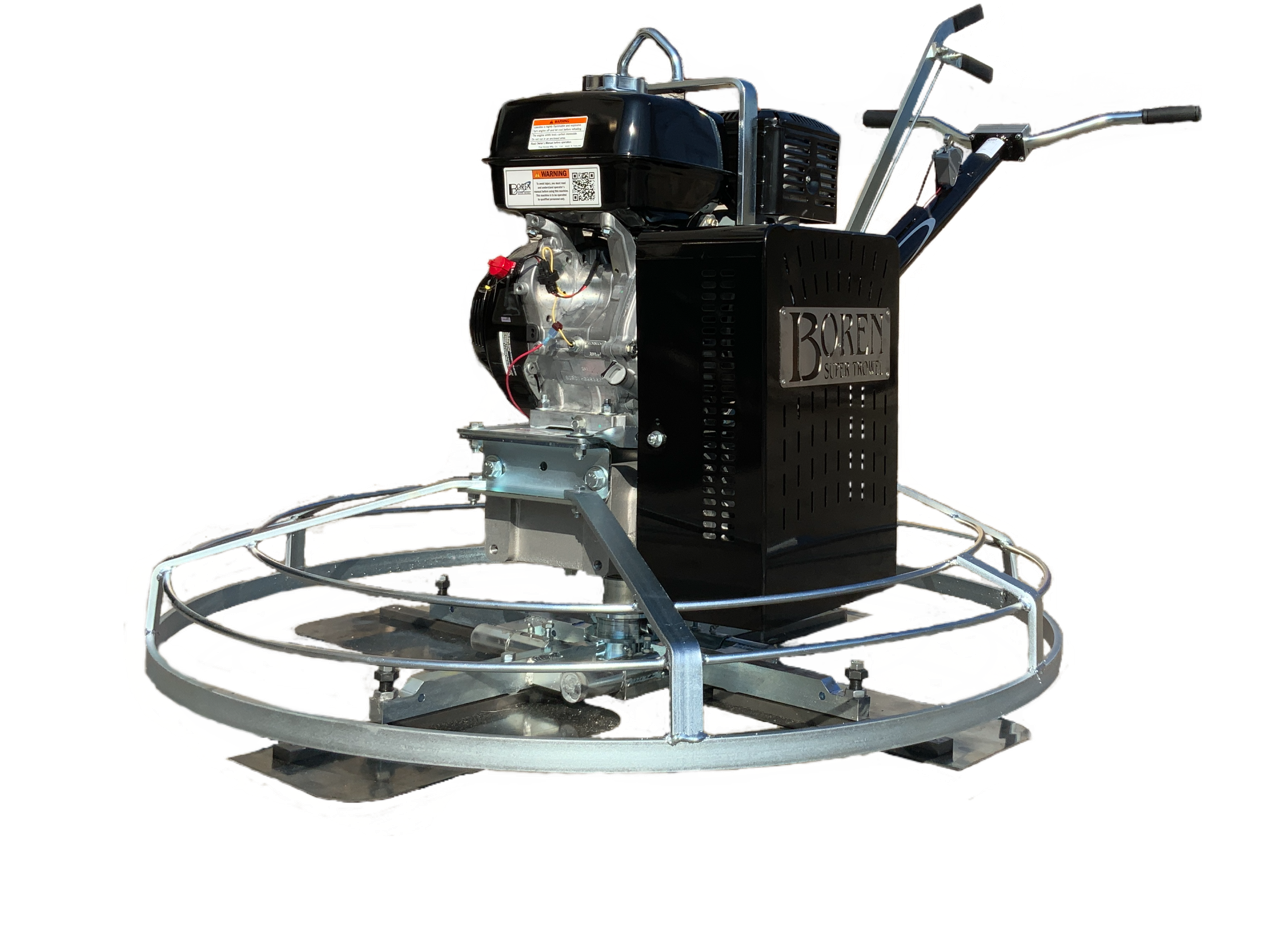

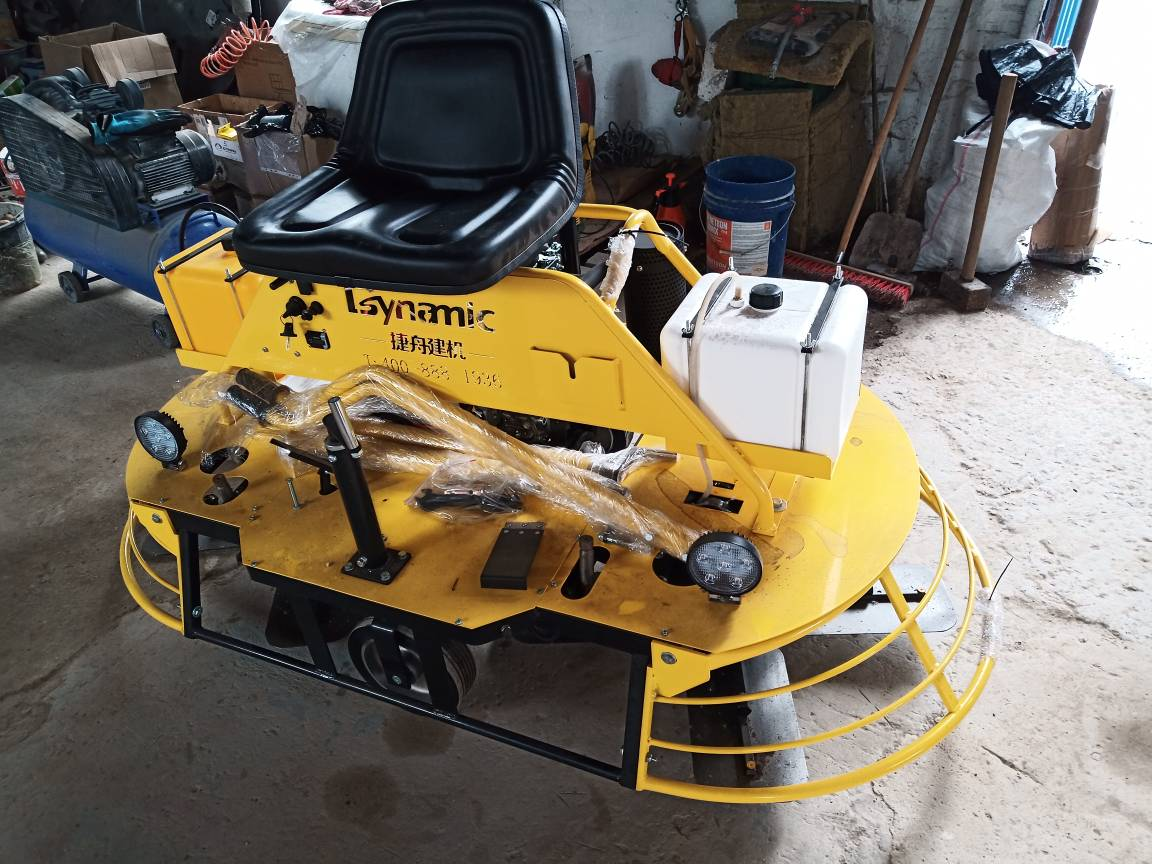
Power trowel

A power trowel (also known as a "power float" and "troweling machine") is a piece of light construction equipment used by construction companies and contractors to apply a smooth finish to concrete slabs.

== Types ==
Power trowels differ in the way they are controlled:

- Ride-on power trowels have two spider/rotor assemblies and are controlled by an operator sitting on a seat upon the machine, controlling the power trowel movement with two joystick/levers (these can be either mechanical or electronic/hydraulic). Blade pitch is controlled either by manual turn handles, (usually both spiders are linked together) or by electric motors and switches. Ride on power trowels range in size from 1.8 m (6 ft) machines weighing 270–320 kg (600–700 lb), up to 3.7 m (12 ft) machines weighing over 910 kg (2,000 lb). Power ranges from small 10 kW (13 hp) single cylinder engines, all the way up to 70 kW (100 hp) multi fuel V8 engines. Drive systems come in two basic variations direct mechanical drive (typically using a CVT style clutch) and hydrostatic drive. Additionally, they are available in overlapping and non-overlapping configurations, the latter allowing the use of float pans.
- Walk-behind power trowels are used by an operator walking behind the machine.

A power trowel performs the tasks of several hand tools, hand trowel, hand float, darby and concrete float.

== See also ==
- Concrete pump – Machine used for transferring liquid concrete by pumping
- Screed – Building construction term
- Trowel – Hand tool

=== Similar vehicles ===
- Personal hovercraft – Type of hovercraft
