= Solid ground floor =

Construction technique

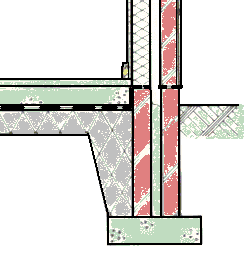
Detail of solid ground floor and foundation.

A solid ground floor consists of a layer of concrete, which in the case of a domestic building will be the surface layer brought up to ground floor level with hardcore filling under it, usually with a concrete slab being below.

The advantage of a solid ground floor is the elimination of dry rot and other problems normally associated with hollow joisted floors. The disadvantage is that the floor is less resilient to walk upon and may be more tiring for the user. Solid ground floors are usually found or situated in a kitchen but will be necessary for other rooms where wood blocks and other similar finishes are required.

== Finishes ==
=== Cement screed ===
The concrete floor may be topped with a 25 mm thick cement and sand screed trowelled to a smooth finish. The usual mix is 1:3 and a colouring agent may be added to the mix to obtain a more attractive finish. The mix should be as dry as possible and the sand should be coarsely graded and clean to avoid shrinkage and cracking which might occur with a wet mix. The floor finish is carefully cured after laying.

=== Granolithic ===
Granolithic is composed of cement and fine aggregate mortar, the aggregate being granite chippings, which will give the hard wearing quality of the finish. It will be laid with screed, troweled or floated to an even and fine finish. Granolithic paving will be suitable in areas which are to receive hard wear although its appearance would not normally be suitable for internal domestic work.

=== PVC tiles ===
Polyvinyl Chloride Tiles- These are another commonly used floor finish. After the floor has been laid with screed, these tiles are fixed with adhesive. They are attractive, smooth and cool, and damage can be repaired very easily as they are made in small square size, usually 150 mm to 225 mm. Though due to poor workmanship and dust this type of floor finish fails through lifting.

=== Terrazzo ===
Terrazzo consists of a colored element binder or matrix and marble chips mixed to specified proportions. The finish is hardwearing, attractive and resistant to chemical attack. Metal (or ebonite) strips divide the terrazzo into bays to avoid shrinkage and expansion.

== See also ==
- Earthen floor
