= YMCA Boston =

- U.S. National Register of Historic Places
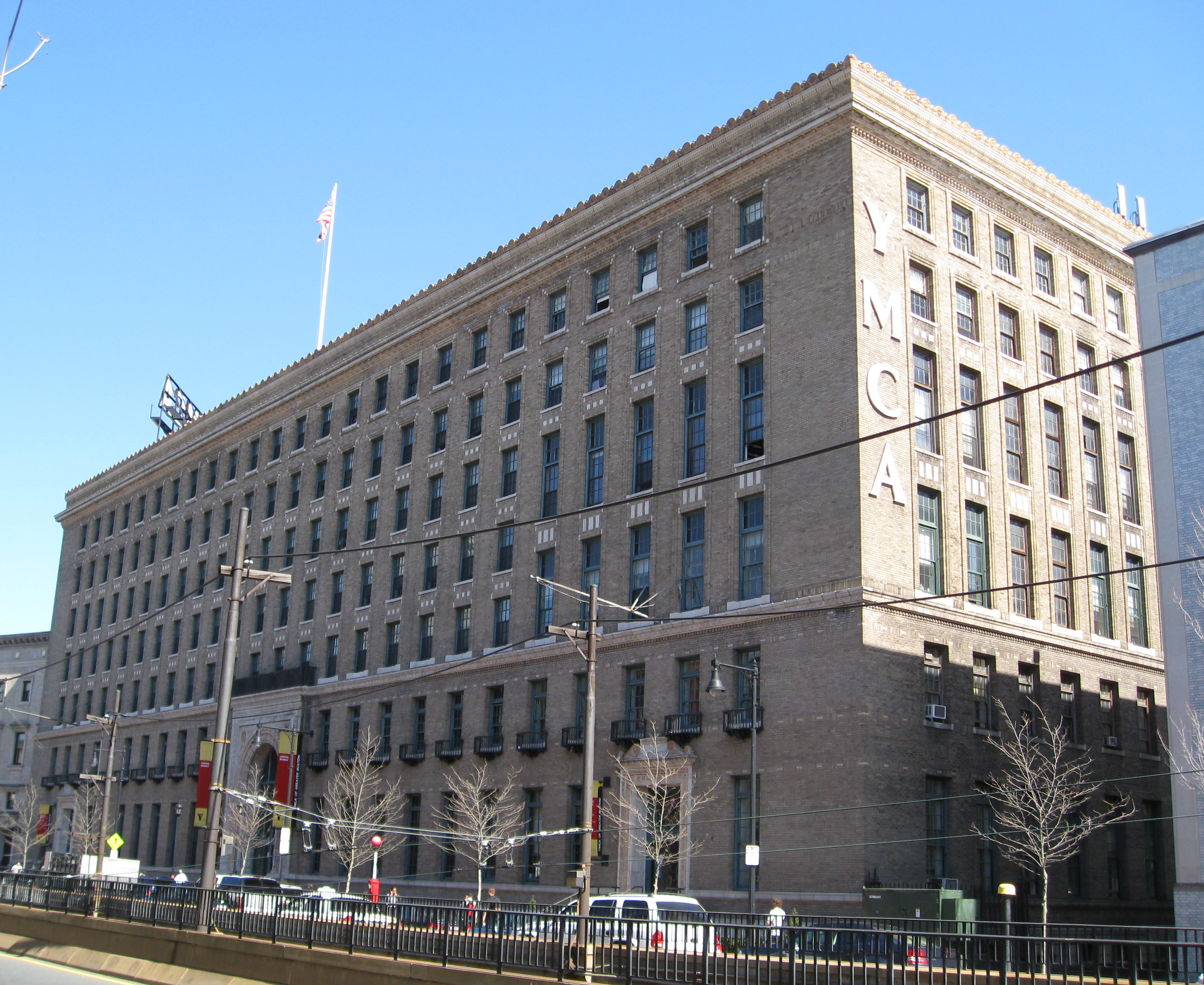

- Location within Massachusetts Location within the United States
- Location: 312-320 Huntington Ave., Boston
- Coordinates: 42°20′26.88″N 71°5′15.36″W
- Area: 1.9 acres (0.77 ha)
- Built: 1911
- Architect: Shepley, Rutan and Coolidge; Woodbury & Leighton
- Architectural style: Classical Revival, tapestry brick
- NRHP reference No.: 98001082
- Added to NRHP: August 20, 1998

YMCA Boston (also known as YMCA of Greater Boston) was founded in 1851 in Boston, Massachusetts, as the first American chapter of YMCA. Its administration building constructed in 1911 was designed by Shepley, Rutan and Coolidge.

== History ==
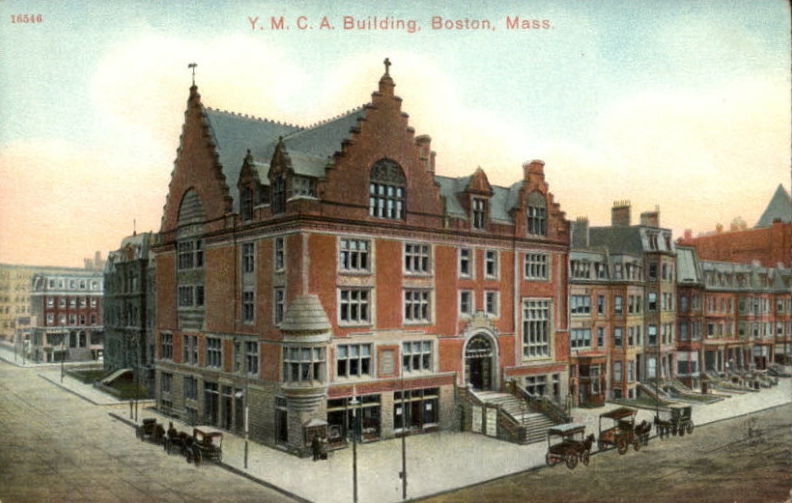
1882 Boston YMCA building

The YMCA of Greater Boston, founded in 1851, was the first YMCA in the United States. The organization began as a modest Evangelical association, and by the late nineteenth century, had become a major social service organization dedicated to improving the lives of young men. With that aim in mind, the YMCA held athletic and educational facilities, provided employment services, offered accommodation for young unmarried men, organized summer camps for boys, and served as a place for young men to socialize.

== YMCA Huntington Avenue ==
=== History ===
As part of the larger movement of institutions out of central Boston following the filling-in of Back Bay, and as a consequence of a series of fires that altered land use and building patterns in downtown Boston as in other parts of the country, many businesses and organizations moved farther away from downtown, farther down Huntington Avenue. Some of these included the Museum of Fine Arts, the New England Conservatory, and the Opera House, all located within the same street block as the site for the new YMCA. These institutions were especially important to the association, because they were, like the YMCA, dedicated to the moral and cultural improvement of Boston residents.

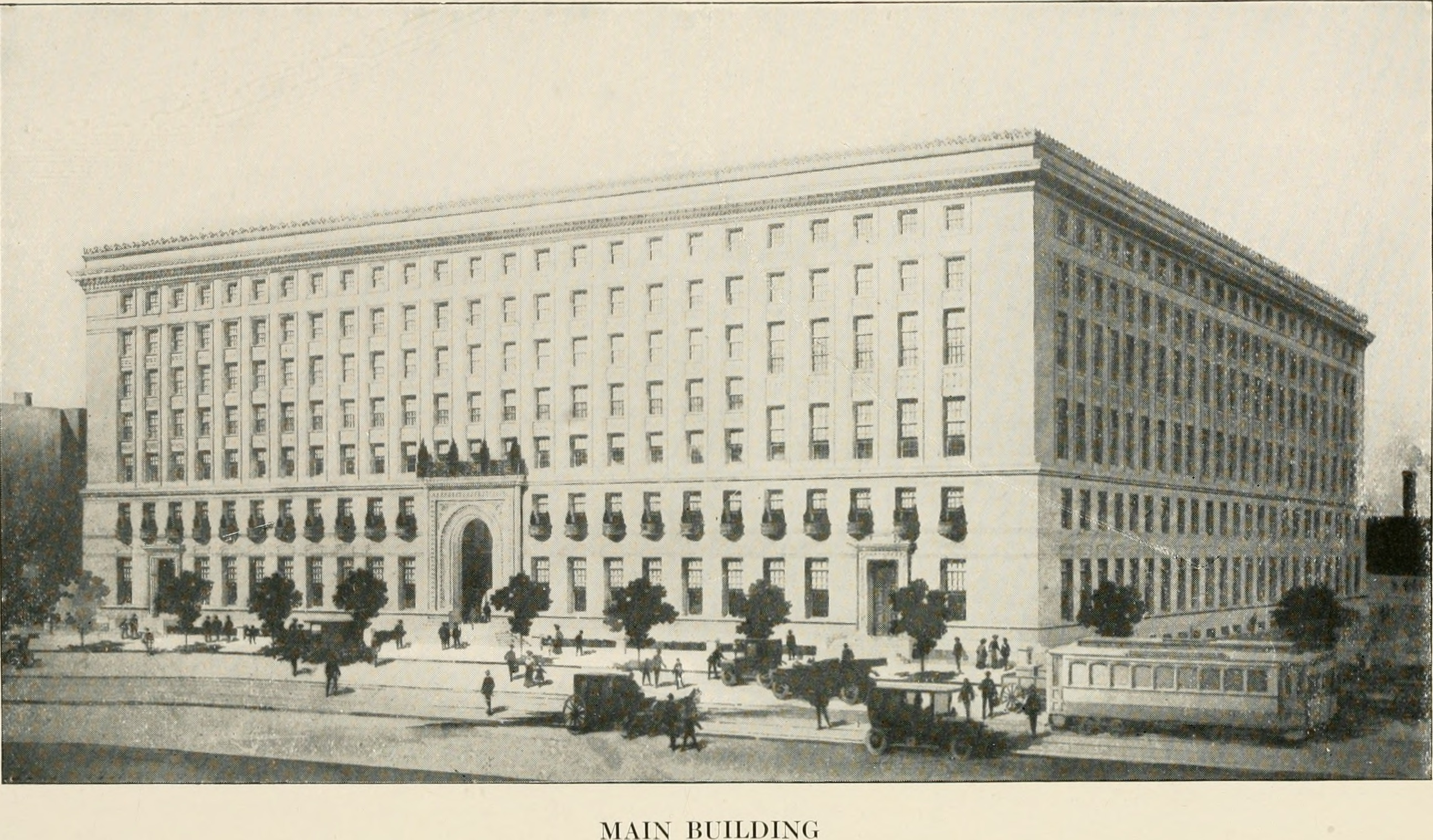
The YMCA Administration Building, 1914

In 1911, construction began on a new complex of buildings for YMCA, designed by prominent Boston architectural firm Shepley, Rutan, and Coolidge. President William Howard Taft participated in the groundbreaking ceremony.

The YMCA on Huntington Avenue is built on a peninsula once known as Gravelly Point, and is adjacent to the land reclaimed by the filling in of Back Bay in the early twentieth century. To reinforce associations with these buildings, the YMCA takes its decorative cues from the neoclassical and renaissance character of adjacent buildings.

To meet the diverse needs of the organization, the firm broke the complex into three distinct but interconnected buildings: a seven-story administration building, which served as the heart of the complex and faced Huntington Avenue, and the smaller gymnasium and educational buildings, both of which were located to the rear of the complex. This complex was known as YMCA Huntington Avenue.

This public works project helped shape the urban context and site for YMCA Huntington. By the time YMCA was constructed, the Gravelly Point area had been transformed into a vital urban area.

In 2012, the Education and Gymnasium buildings were sold to developers, and the interior of the Administration building was completely renovated.

=== Administration Building ===
The Administration Building faces Huntington Avenue and is faced with grey brick. It is the most distinctive element of the complex.

The ground floor of this building originally held a sumptuous lobby, clad with lavish wood paneling and terrazzo marble floors. The lobby opened into a double height, sky-lit main reception hall, likewise decorated in an elegant fashion. The use of expensive materials in the lobby and reception hall affirmed the status of YMCA as a well-funded organization and reinforced its intention to cultivate 'good taste' among its members. Around the reception hall stood a billiards room, game room, social rooms, and a spa; amenities intended to lure young men away from bars and saloons. A secondary entrance on Huntington Avenue led to Bates Hall, a large auditorium.

YMCA used the floors above for classrooms and offices and a well-appointed library. An original blueprint conserved in the Northeastern University Archives shows that select classrooms were designated as Bible Study Rooms, evidence of the institution's continued adherence to its founding ideas.

The uppermost floors held dormitory rooms for young men. Communal toilets, showers, and bathtubs were located on each of these floors. A corner suite on the sixth floor held a nurse's station and “sick room.” In combination with the amenities offered on the lower levels, the administration hall functions much like modern day college resident halls.

=== Education building ===
The building's original plans indicate that it was a simple rectangle in shape and was composed of six floors including the basement. While the basement was devoted almost purely to mechanical services and offices, the ground floor included study, reading and clubrooms, a pool and game rooms, as well as offices and an entrance lobby. The second floor held classrooms for the study of languages, history, science, and grammar. On the third floor were law, commerce, accountancy, bookkeeping, mathematics, and art. The fourth floor consisted of larger recitation, drawing, and lecture rooms as well as various science laboratories. Finally, the top fifth floor held small boys' dormitories. Each floor featured a central long hallway surrounded on all sides by classrooms and labs, offices, or larger gathering spaces.

YMCA offered both classes and boarding at prices that were significantly lower than those of nearby the academic institutions and was open in the evening, so that young men who worked during the day could access their services. The organization's many popular lectures and classes were in such demand that they were incorporated into what was then known then as Northeastern College, a degree granting institution. Soon thereafter, YMCA purchased adjacent land on Huntington and founded Northeastern University. It was not until about the mid-twentieth century that through a change of bylaws, the University established itself as a separate institution from YMCA.

=== Gymnasium ===
In the early 1880s, gymnasiums developed into a key element of YMCA's character-building programs. Under the direction of Director Walter C. Douglas, YMCA Boston adopted the Fourfold Plan. The plan, developed by YMCA of Greater New York, combined evangelism with athletics and encouraged attention to all four aspects of a young man's life: spiritual, intellectual, physical and social. At the same time, YMCA Boston also redefined its qualifications for membership. For the first time, all men of Boston, evangelical Christian and non-Christian alike, were able to join YMCA. YMCA's membership, not surprisingly, grew considerably.

The inclusion of a modern gymnasium (the Boston organization's first dedicated gymnasium) and swimming pool reflected YMCA's enhanced commitment to physical fitness. The basement of the building held fencing, wrestling and boxing courts, along with two double-height handball courts and a six-lane bowling alley. The first floor offered access to gallery seating for viewing matches in the handball courts, as well as an exercise room with wood floors and a large, sky lit swimming pool with a slide and spring board. A marble paneled massage room also offered amenities such as table massages, steam baths, electric baths, needle showers and dressing rooms. The second floor had a gallery with seating above the pool, as well as three gymnasiums, one large room flanked by two smaller gymnasiums, were located along the east wall with separations between them. A running track mezzanine ran above them on the perimeter. One could use the spiral stairs located in the corners of the gymnasiums to ascend the mezzanine level.

Locker rooms were an essential feature of the gymnasium building. YMCA Huntington had 3 distinct locker rooms within its facilities. The basement held a large boy's locker room with lockers for storing athletic clothing and an adjacent large shower room. On the first floor there were two locker rooms. The businessmen's locker room was the smaller of the two, with individual marble shower stalls, marble walls, granolithic floors and oak benches with white iron bases. The locker room led to the business men's club room. The men's club locker room also occupied the first floor. It was split into a large and a small locker room with a group shower lined in terra cotta and marble. The men's club locker room also offered amenities such as individual shower stalls, fan rooms and steam baths. It too had the marble walls, granolithic floors and oak benches with white iron bases. The separation of spaces, specifically within the 3 distinct locker rooms, correlated to YMCA's policy regarding segregation and distinction by class, race and gender.

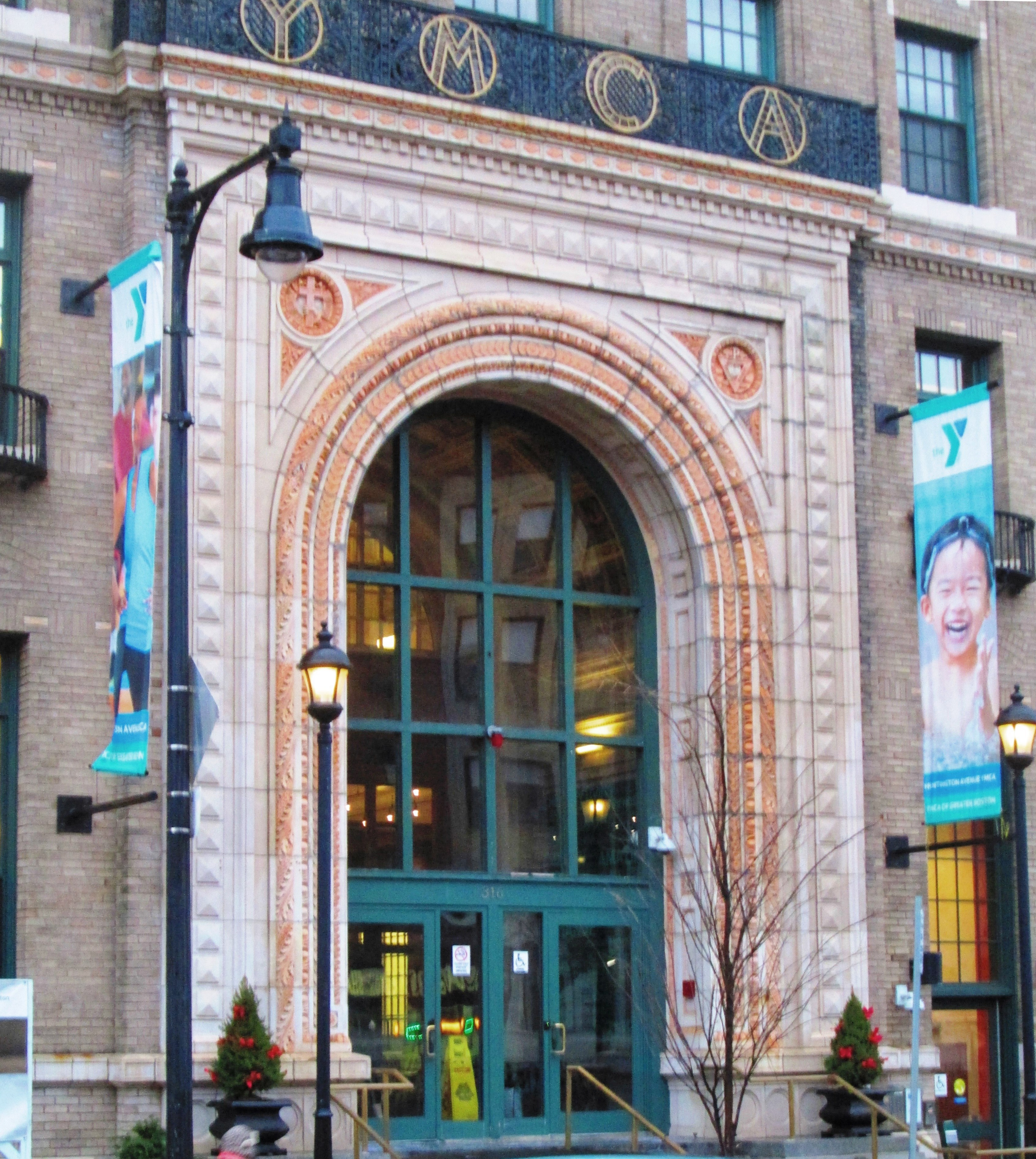
The entrance to the Administration building

=== Recent developments ===
The building is a distinctive feature of the Boston landscape, especially its tapestry brick façade on Huntington Avenue crowned with a large incandescent bulb block letter sign, the only one of its kind left in New England. In 1998, the building was added to the National Register of Historic Places.

In 2012 YMCA sold its gym building and Hastings wing to the Phoenix Property Co. for $21.5 million. The real estate company is in the process of building a 17-story dormitory that will be leased to Northeastern University behind Administration Building.

Starting in 2012, YMCA invested $40 million, including a $1 million gift from Liberty Mutual Insurance, into its retained space to create a modern community center that is welcoming and accessible to all. The new Y offers over 10,000 square feet of strengthen and cardio space, an expanded pool, locker rooms for men, women, families and children, a dedicated teen center, classrooms for after school and adult education, gym, sport courts and multi-purpose studios. The new lobby embraces the history of YMCA and the historic building while providing modern amenities.

However, the changes to the historical YMCA complex, such as the demolition of the pool to make way for the residential facility, have been met with stiff opposition from the community. Close to 1,000 members of YMCA signed a petition to prevent the Phoenix Property Co. and Northeastern from constructing the new dormitory. An organization named "Save Boston YMCA" has formed to fight the project. Calvin Arey, a leader of the opposition states that Northeastern and Phoenix property Co. are "destroying a property that's on the National Register of Historic Places" and that "this was never intended to be an area for 17 story towers." Regardless, the new dormitory was constructed and construction finished in 2015.

== See also ==
- YMCA
- Northeastern University of the Boston YMCA
- National Register of Historic Places listings in southern Boston, Massachusetts
