= Power screed =

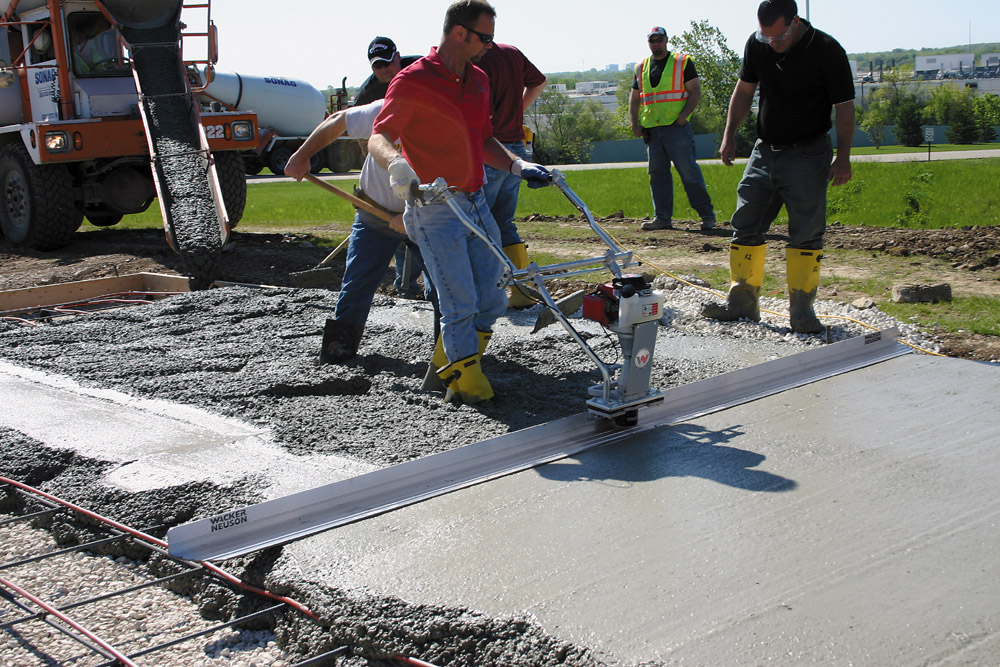
A power screed being used to flatten concrete

A power concrete screed is a tool used to smooth and level freshly poured concrete surfaces. It can be used in place of a man-powered screed bar to strike off excess concrete. A power screed works by consolidating and/or vibrating the wet concrete mixture. The screed moves back and forth, as friction screeds or "roller" screeds level the concrete, filling holes and lowering any high spots. Power screeds can be powered by gas, electricity or hydraulics.

In concrete, prior to the mix drying, the concrete should be smoothed out on the desired surface. The compaction performance of the power concrete screed is mainly determined by the centrifugal force of the vibration force and only to a minor extent by the static weight.
