= Granolithic =

Composite construction material

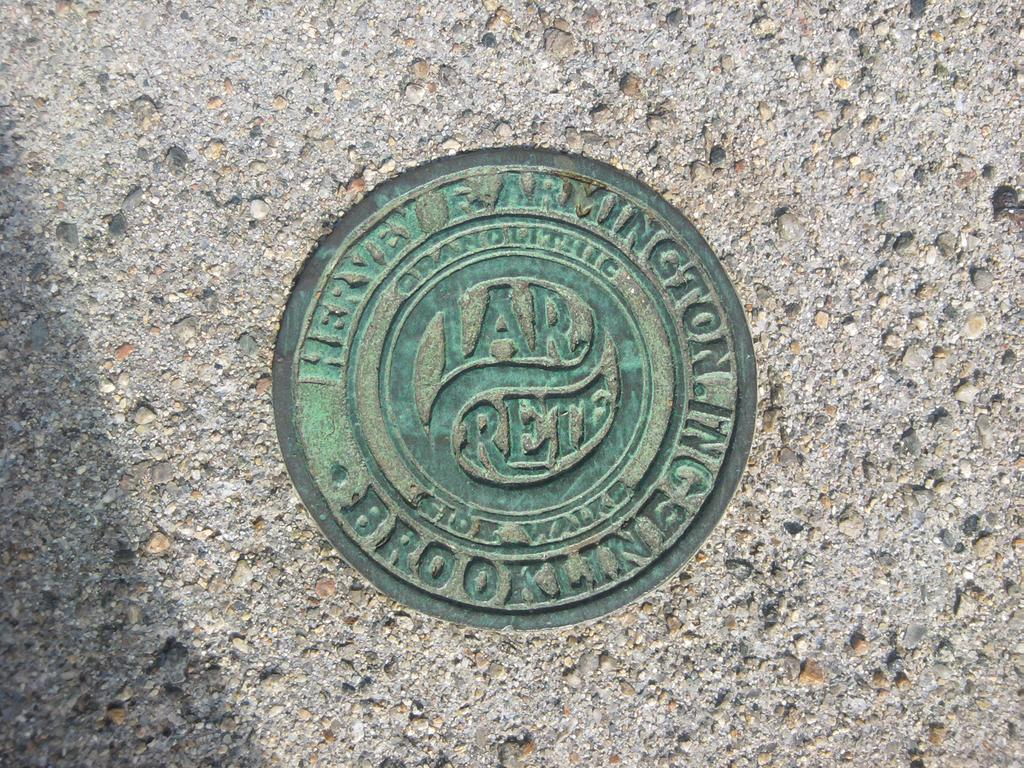
Close-up of granolithic sidewalk.

Granolithic screed, also known as granolithic paving and granolithic concrete, is a type of construction material composed of cement and fine aggregate such as granite or other hard-wearing rock. It is generally used as flooring, or as paving (such as for sidewalks). It has a similar appearance to concrete, and is used to provide a durable surface where texture and appearance are usually not important (such as outdoor pathways or factory floors). It is commonly laid as a screed. Screeds are a type of flooring laid on top of the structural element (like reinforced concrete) to provide a level surface on which the "wearing flooring" (the flooring which people see and walk on) is laid. A screed can also be laid bare, as it provides a long-lasting surface.

The aggregate mixed with the cement can be of various size, shape, and material, depending on the texture of the surface needed and how long-lasting it must be. The aggregate is usually sifted so that the particles are roughly the same size, which helps reduce air pockets in the material (which can weaken it). Generally, the mix of aggregate to cement is 2.5 to 1 by volume.

Granolithic screed or paving can be problematic. Because it is made with a high cement content and requires a great deal of water to mix, it may crack while drying. It can also come loose from the material below (especially if the lower material is not properly prepared). Pouring the material in layers is generally avoided. Cracking and curling can be reduced by dividing the area to be covered into smaller sections and then pouring the material. Debonding of the granolithic material can also be significantly avoided by using bonding agents like epoxy resins or polymer latex.

A high degree of skill in pouring and finishing the material is needed to prevent problems. Sealers and hardeners can be added to the granolithic material to improve its resistance to wear.

== See also ==
- roughcast (pebbledash): visually somewhat similar, but used mostly on outer walls

== Bibliography ==
- Emmitt, Stephen and Gorse, Christopher A. Barry's Introduction to Construction of Buildings. Chichester, U.K.: Wiley-Blackwell, 2010.
- Harris, Cyril M. Dictionary of Architecture and Construction. New York: McGraw-Hill, 2005.
- Ingham, Jeremy P. Geomaterials Under the Microscope: A Colour Guide. London: Manson, 2011.
- Ransom, W.H. Building Failures: Diagnosis and Avoidance. Florence, Ky.:Taylor & Francis, 1987.
- Snow, Dennis. Plant Engineer's Reference Book. 2d ed. Oxford: Butterworth-Heinemann, 2002.
- O'Brien, Chris "Joseet, Rueben" 2014.
