= Screed =

Building construction term

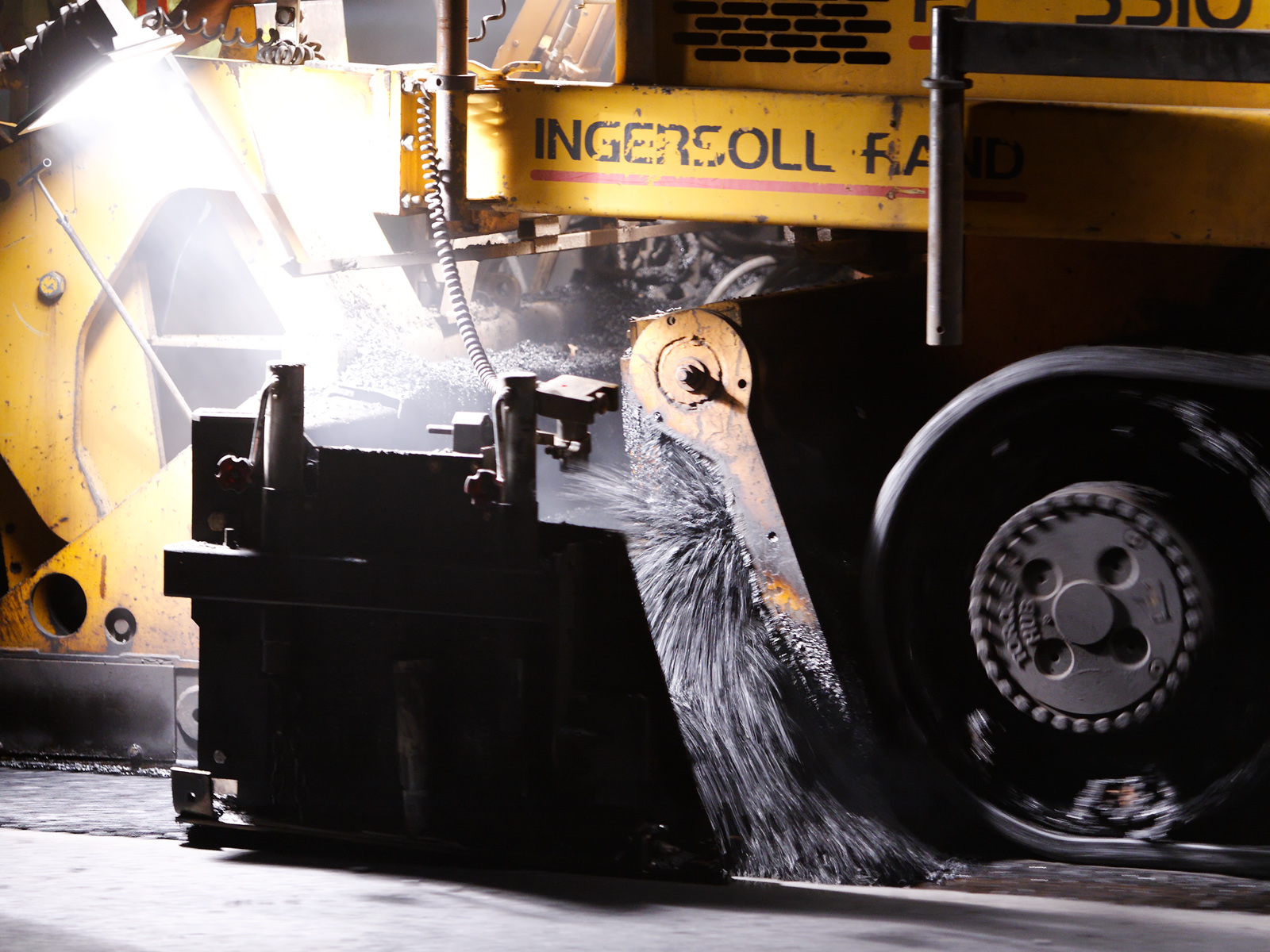
The screed on this paver spreads and smooths the asphalt.

Screed has three meanings in building construction:

1. A flat board (screed board, floating screed) or a purpose-made aluminium tool used to smooth and to level materials like concrete, stucco and plaster after they have been placed on a surface or to assist in flattening;
2. A strip of plaster or wood applied to a surface to act as a guide for a screed tool (screed rail, screed strip, screed batten);
3. The material itself which has been flattened with a screed (screed coat). In the UK, screed has also come to describe a thin, top layer of material (sand and cement, magnesite, or calcium sulphate), poured in place on top of the structural concrete or insulation, on top of which other finishing materials can be applied, or the structural material can be left bare to achieve a raw effect.

== Screed board ==
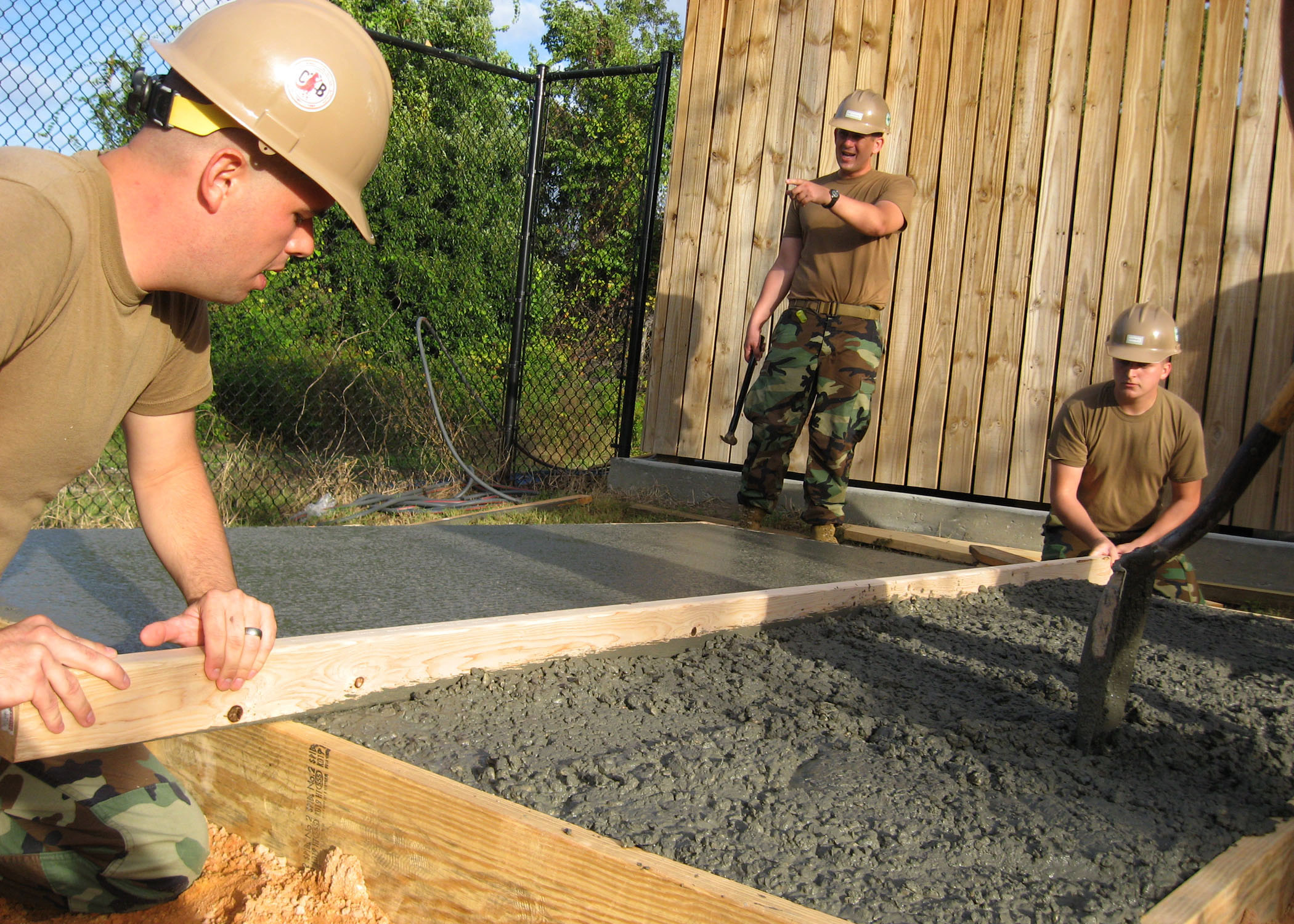
United States Navy Seabees use a screed (noun) to screed (verb) wet concrete. The form-work acts as screed rails.

In the United States, a person called a concrete finisher performs the process of screeding, which is the process of cutting off excess wet concrete to bring the top surface of a slab to the proper grade and smoothness. A power concrete screed has a gasoline motor attached, which helps smooth and vibrate concrete as it is flattened. After the concrete is flattened it is smoothed with a concrete float or power trowel. A concrete floor is sometimes called a solid ground floor.

A plasterer also may use a screed to level a wall or ceiling surface in plasterwork.

This sense of screed has been extended to asphalt paving where a free floating screed is part of a machine that spreads the paving material.

== Screed rails ==
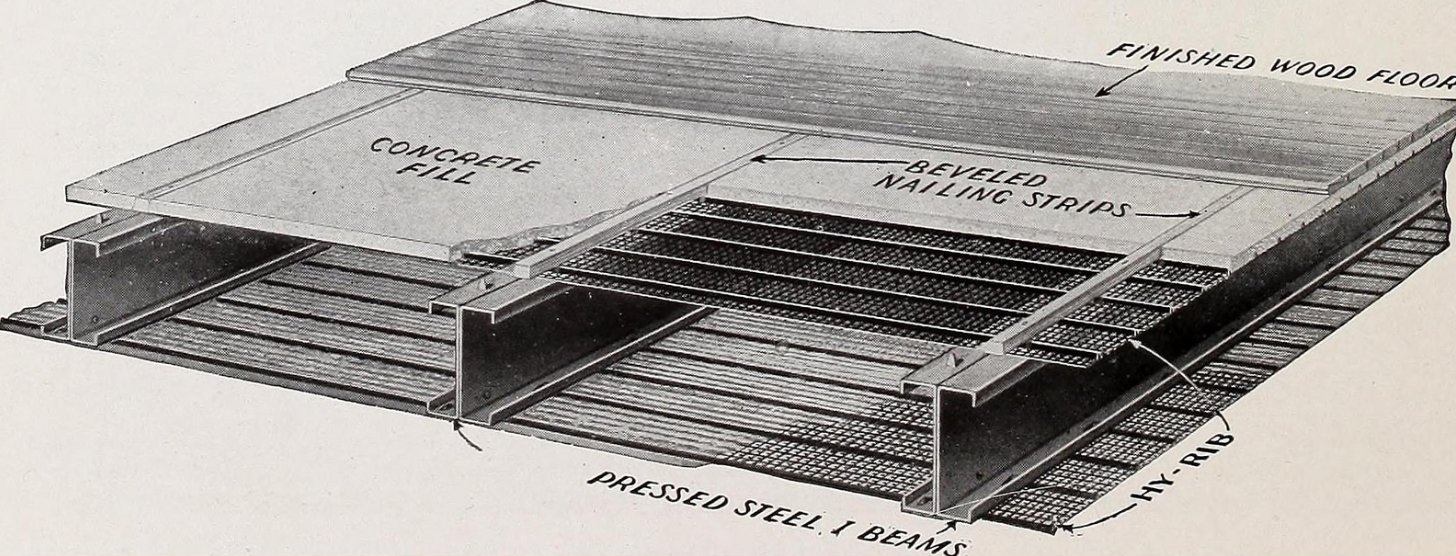
The wood pieces labeled "beveled nailing strips" act as screed rails in this installation of a screed coating on Hy-Rib brand wire lath.

A weep screed or sill screed is a screed rail which has drainage holes to allow moisture which penetrated an exterior plaster or stucco coating to drain through the screed.

== Liquid and flow screeds ==
Flowing screeds are made from inert fillers such as sand, with a binder system based on cement or often calcium sulphate. Flow screeds are often preferred to traditional screeds as they are easier and faster to install and provide a similar finish. Flow screed is often used in combination with underfloor heating installation.

Liquid flow screed is self-levelling. No vibration is necessary to remove bubbles and densify the liquid mass. Due to the easy consolidation thickness can sometimes be reduced in comparison to conventional screeds. This minimises heat storage leading to a floor that reacts quickly to user requirement hence raising the efficacy of underfloor heating.

== Screed coats ==
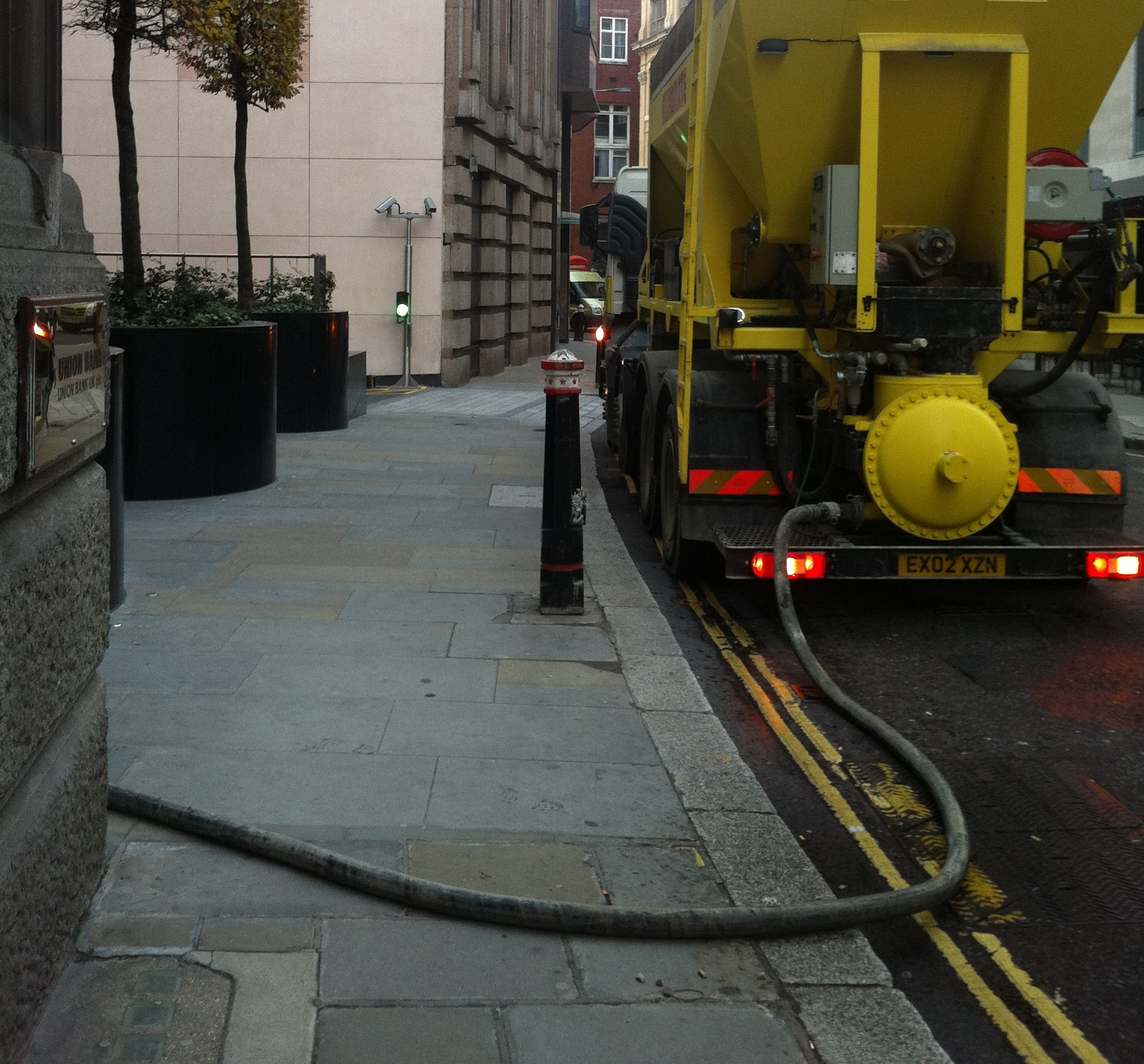
Screed (material) pumping truck

A development in the UK is the delivery, mixing, and pumping of screed from a single vehicle. Where previously screed jobs required a separate pump to administer the screed, these new machines can now administer the screed directly from the mixing pan to the floor at a range of up to 60 meters. For example, the material called granolithic.

== See also ==
- Screed wire, an alternate name for a ground wire in electrical work

== Sources ==
- Constructing Architecture – Materials, Processes, Structures: A Handbook; Andrea Deplazes (ed.); Birkhauser, 2005
