= Free floating screed =

Part of a paving machine that spreads and smooths paving material

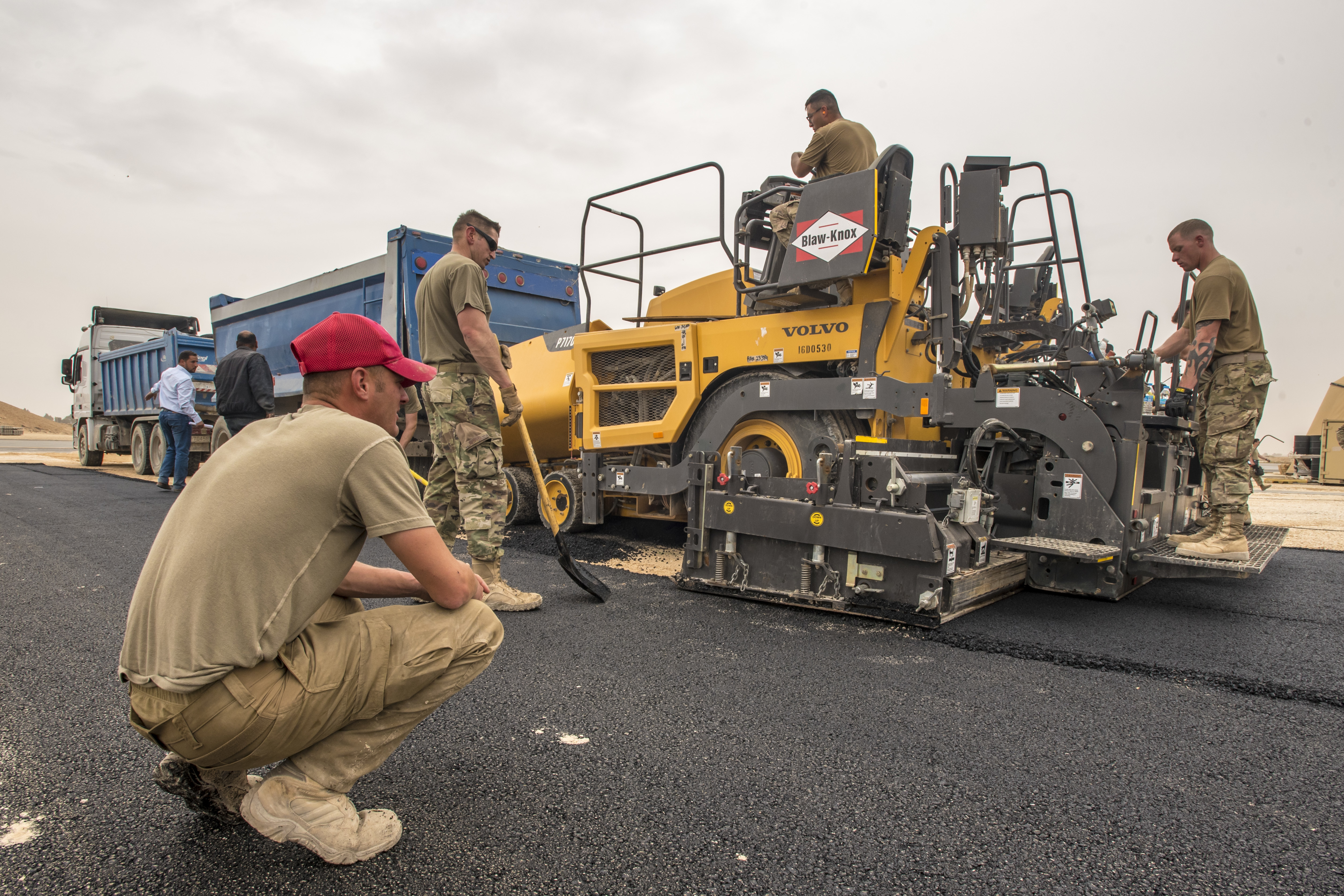
The screed is seen at the back of the paver, smoothing the paving mixture under the control of its operator, standing at the center of the screed.

The free floating screed is a device pioneered in the 1930s that revolutionized the asphalt paving process. The device is designed to spread and smooth out, or screed, the material (e.g. concrete or asphalt) below it.

== Description ==
The screed connects to the tractor portion of the paving machine via its tow arm. Paving material is transferred from the hopper at the front of the tractor to the screed, and augers spread it across the width of the screed. The material then flows out across the width of the screed at the desired depth. A screed operator stands on a platform at the center of the screed and controls the placement of the paving mixture. Adjusting screed settings will change the placement depth and width, as well as amount of material being placed. Many modern screeds can be run in an automatic mode, too.

Because the only connection between the asphalt paver and the screed is the tow arm, the screed can "float" vertically relative to the paver. This allows the paver to traverse uneven ground while the screed floats over the material placed in front of it.

The free floating screed has become standard because of the smoothing or averaging effect it can have on the existing base course. The free floating screed has a number of forces acting on it that, when in equilibrium, allow the depth behind the screed to be constant.

- Tow arm pull: the force exerted on the screed by the paver dragging it
- Mass: the weight of the screed
- Resistance of the head of material: the opposing force exerted on the screed by the pile of material in front of the screed. This force depends in turn on the material's viscosity and mass.

The angle at which the tow arm pull is exerted on the screed also contributes to the motion; its resultant force is either added or subtracted from the mass of the screed.

If each of these forces is constant, altering the angle of the screed to the horizontal (angle of attack) will control the amount of material extruded behind the screed. Increasing the angle of attack will cause the screed to climb higher through the pile of material, and therefore raise its trailing edge, increasing the amount of material extruded behind the screed. Similarly, reducing the angle of attack will reduce the amount of material extruded.

== Patent ==
The free floating screed was first developed by Harry H. Barber, one of the founders of the Barber-Greene Co., in 1933 for which he received patent number US 2138828A ("Machine for and process of laying roads") three years later. Barber Green dominated the market for free floating screed equipment until the patent expired in 1955, and now all major asphalt paver manufacturers use this design principle in their equipment.

== See also ==
- Road surface
