= List of timber framing tools =

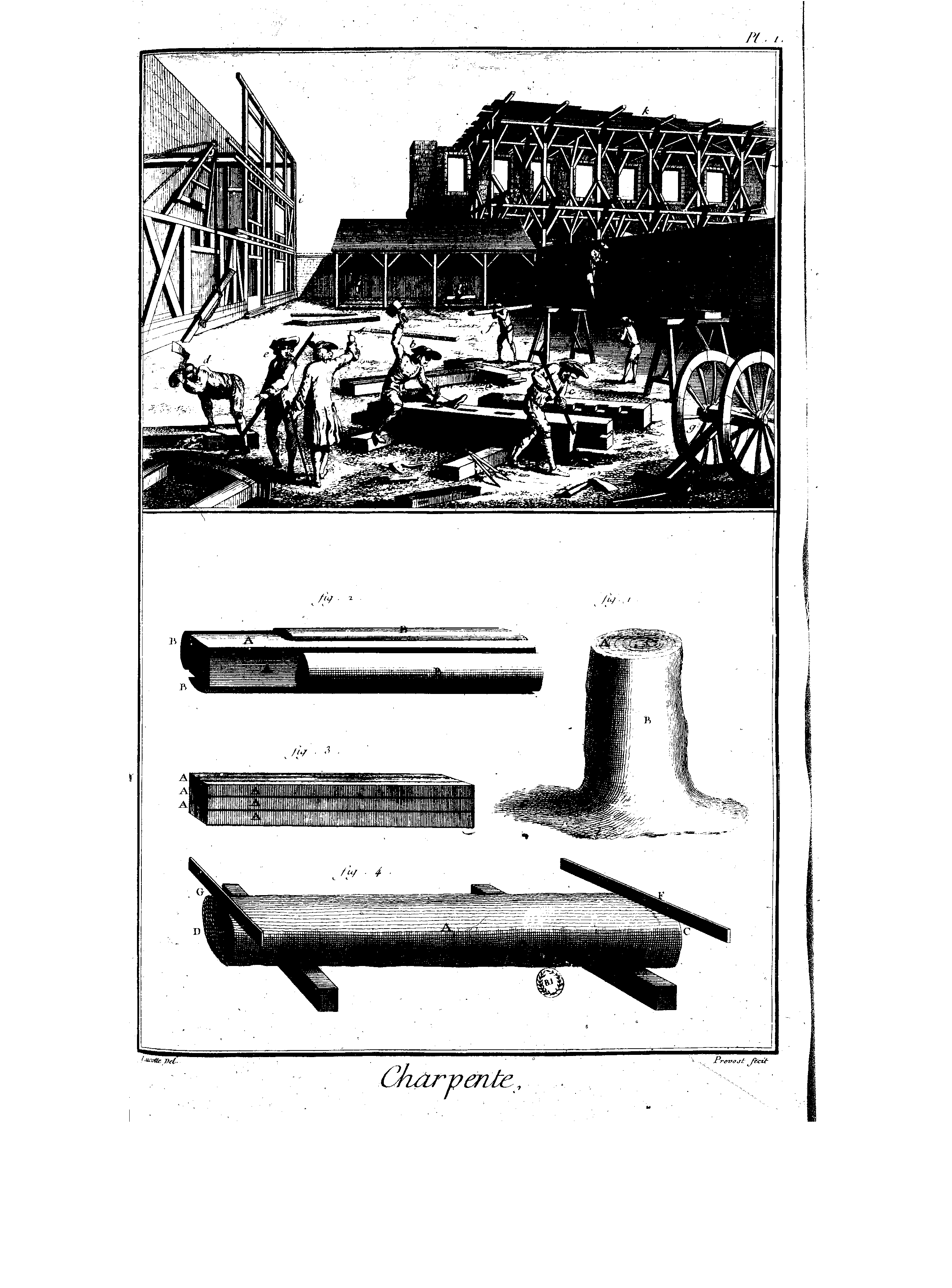
Illustration of carpentry (charpente) in the French Encyclopédie showing hewing, mortising, pit sawing on trestles. Tools include dividers, axes, chisel and mallet, beam cart, pit saw, trestles, and bisaigue . The men talking may be holding a story pole and rule (or walking cane). Shear legs are hoisting a timber. Below, the sticks on the log are winding sticks used to align the ends of a timber.

Tools used in traditional timber framing date back thousands of years. Similar tools are used in many cultures, but the shapes vary and some are pulled rather than pushed.

== Gallery ==
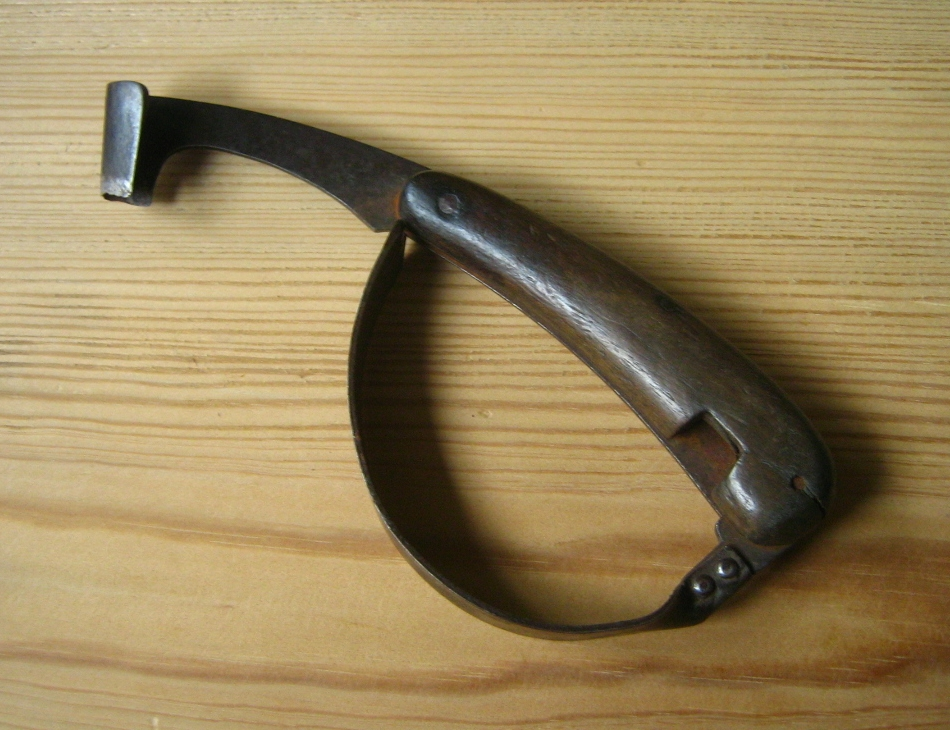
A folding type of race knife

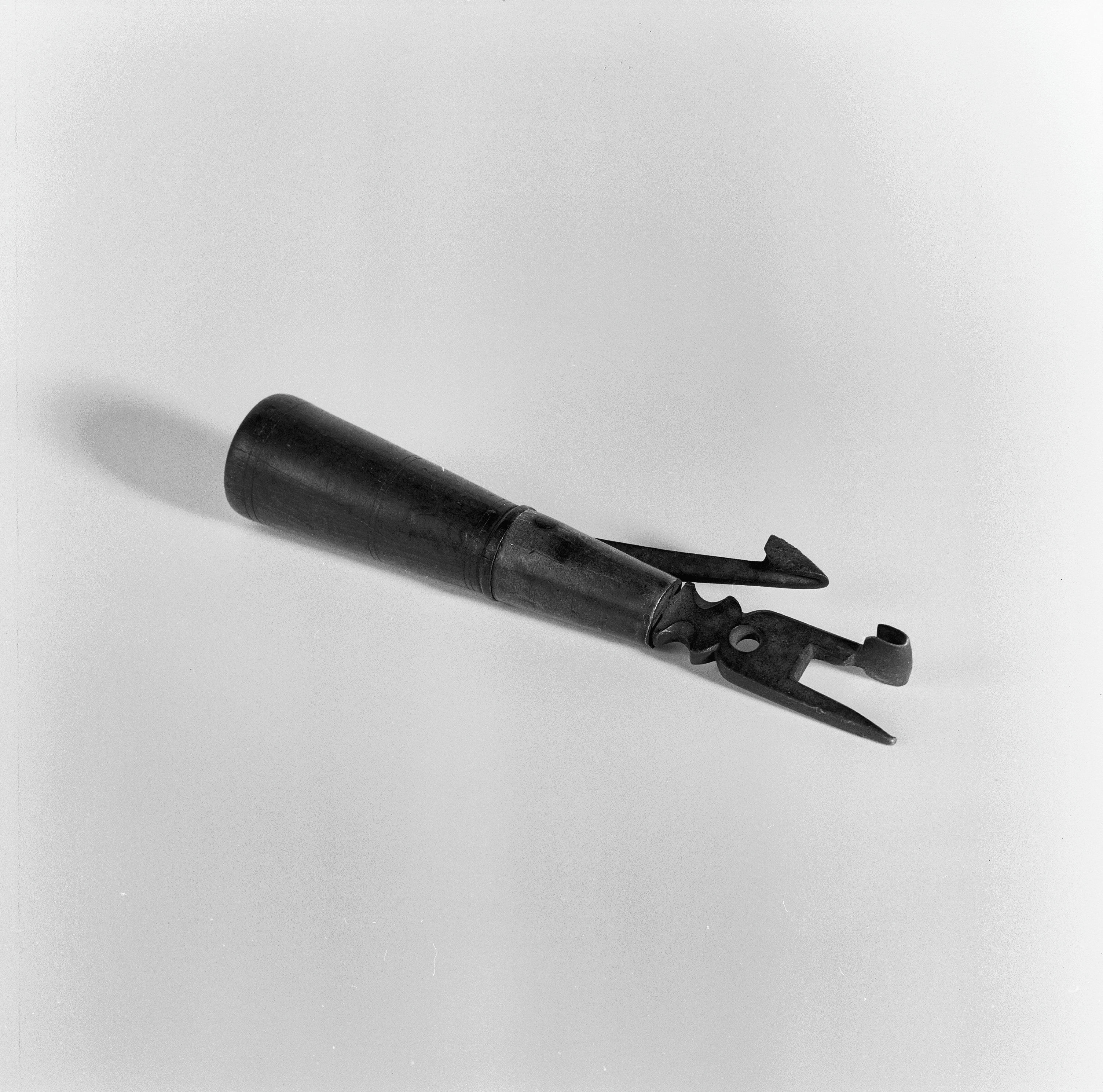
Race knife capable of making circles.(ritsmes en ritspasser met uitgeklapt). Image:Cultural Heritage Agency of the Netherlands

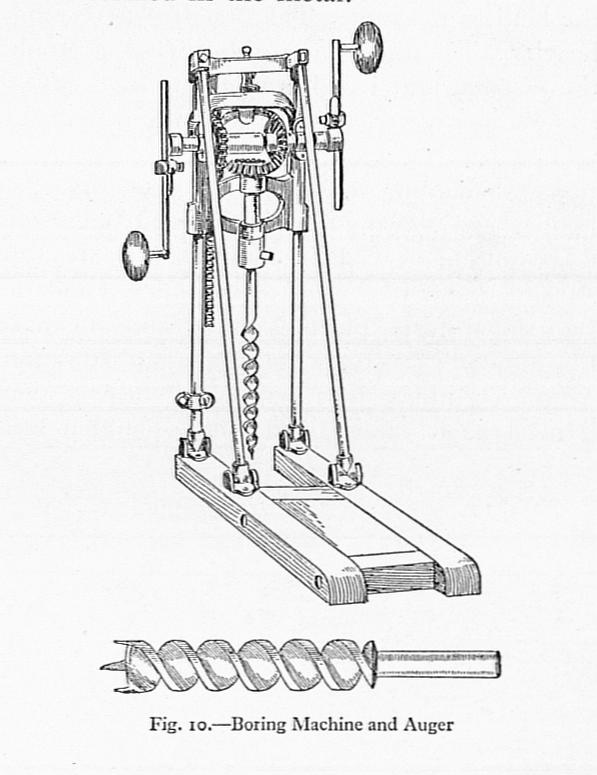
Hand boring machine (Carpentry and Joinery magazine, 1925)

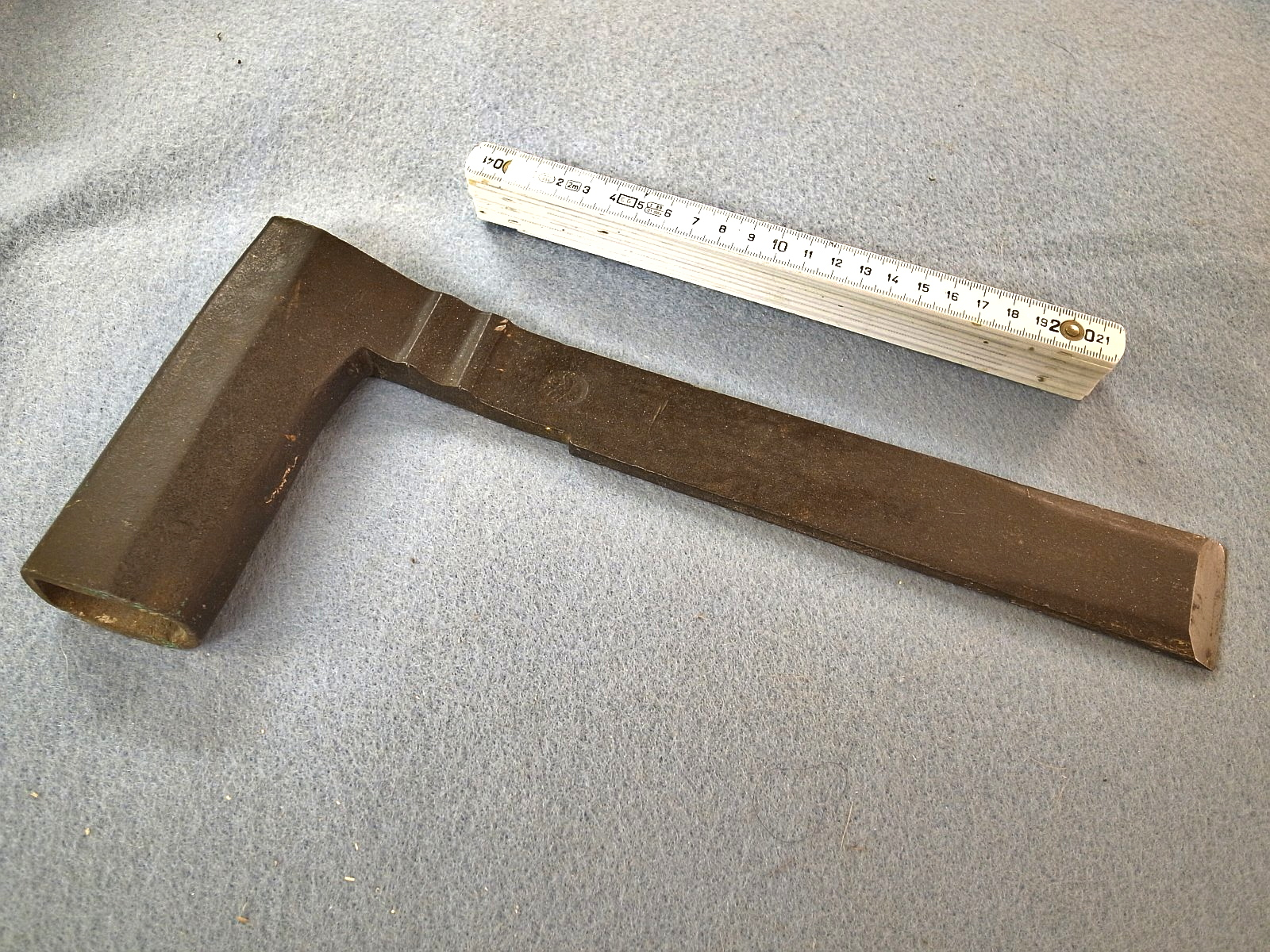
A type of mortising chisel called in German a Stossaxt (Stoßaxt) or stichaxt. No wooden handle is inserted in the head, the metal head itself is the tools grip.

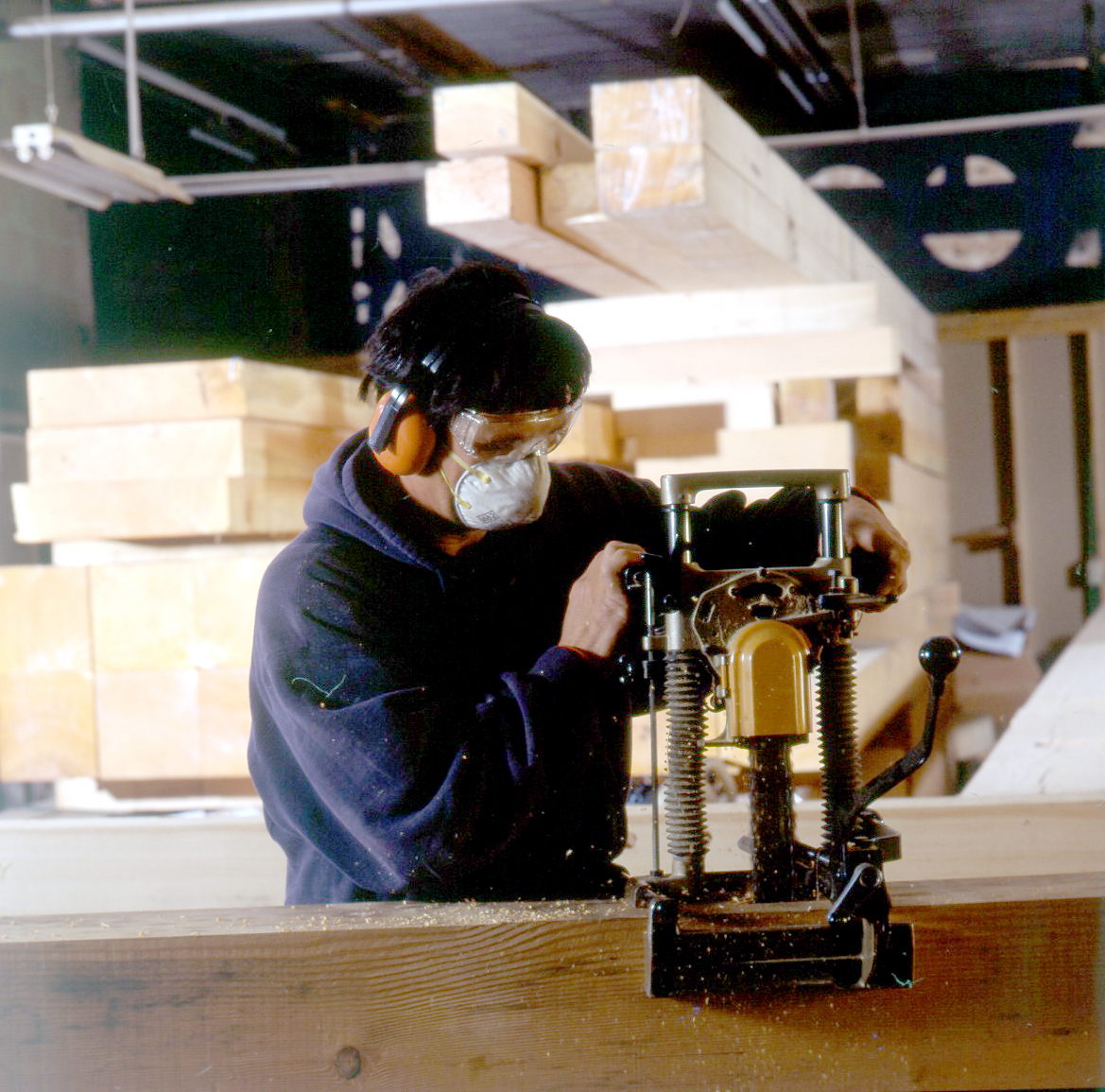
A chain mortiser.

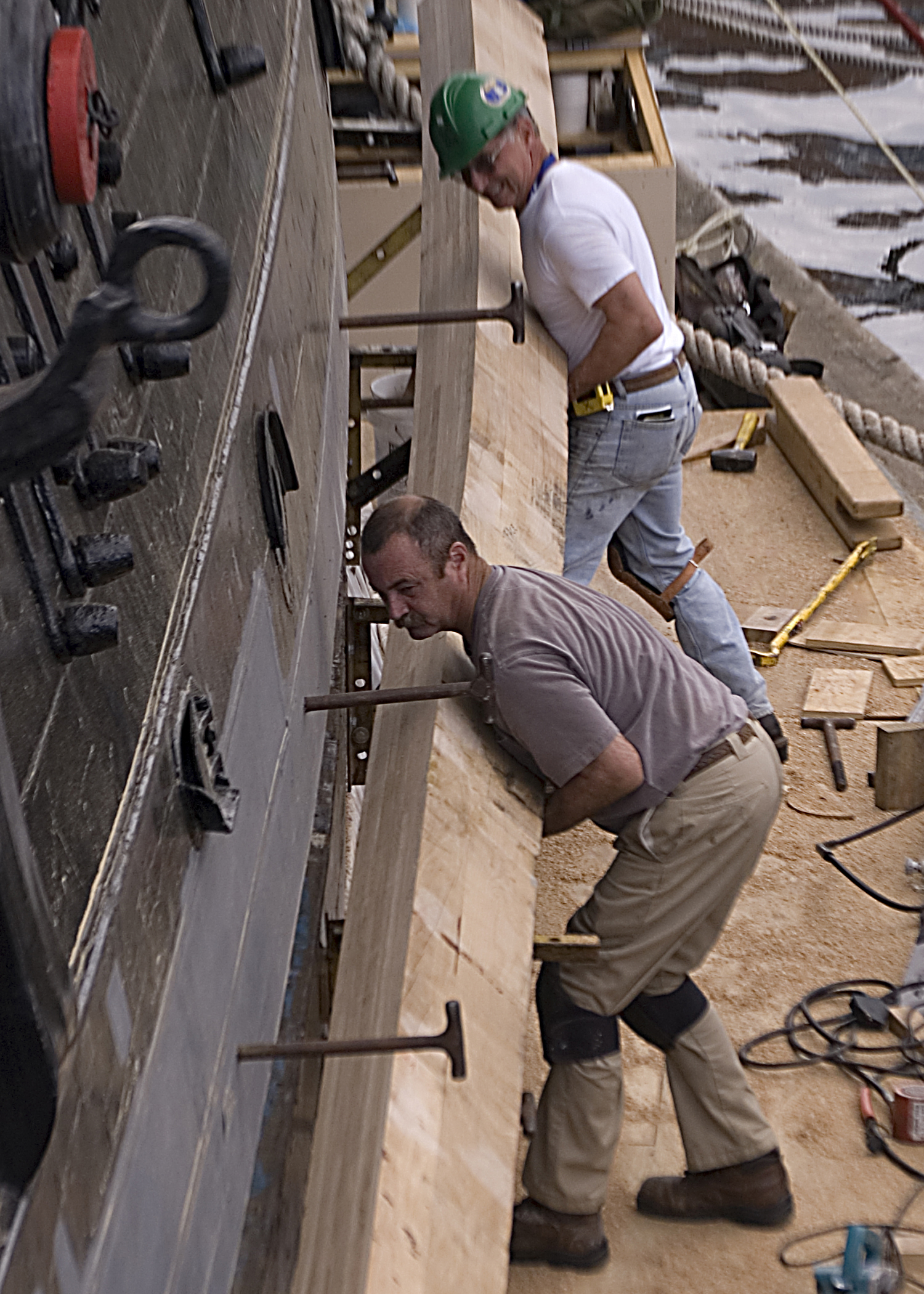
Draw-bore pins (hook pins) are the metal pins sticking out of the plank above the plank being added to the USS Constitution during restoration.

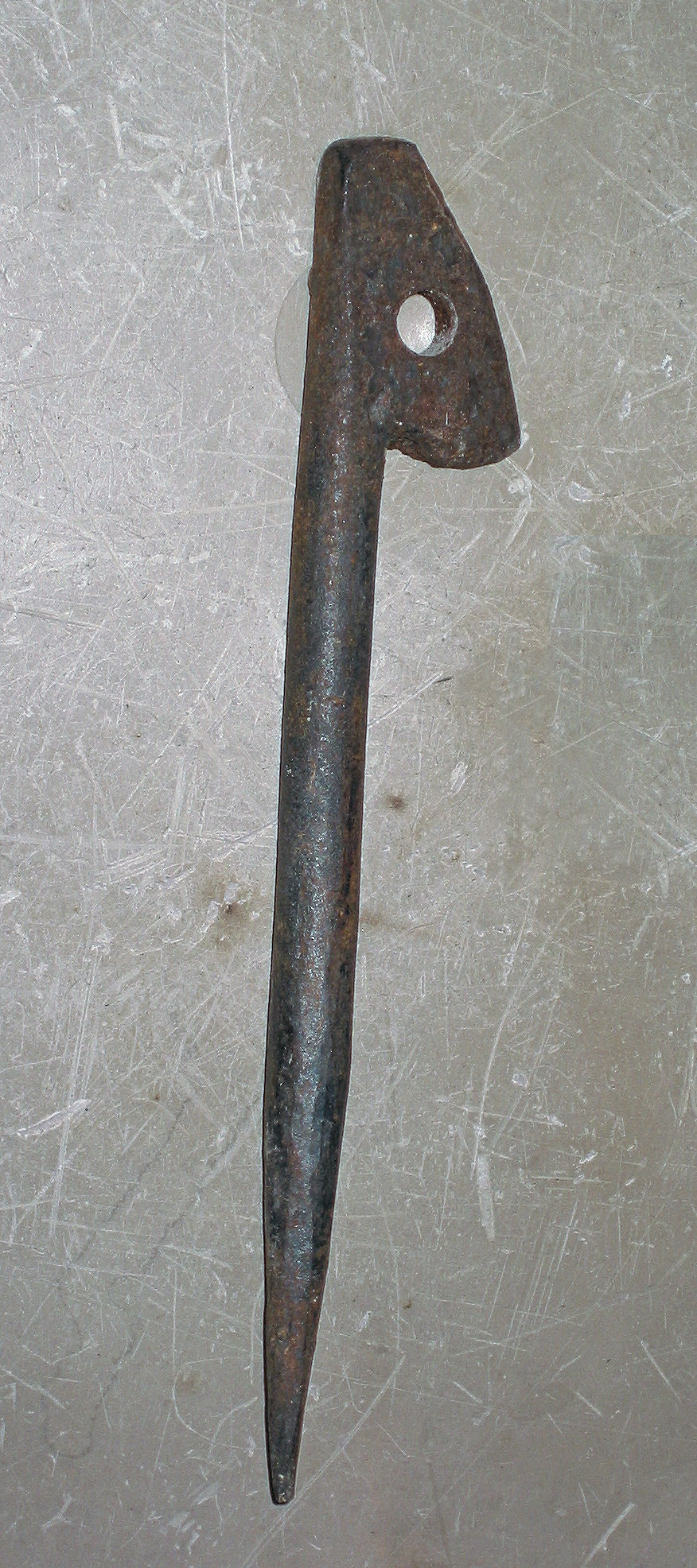
A hook pin or draw-bore pin

== Preparing timbers ==
- Conversion of logs into timbers was often done by someone other than the timber framer including a lumberjack, sawyer, farmer, or laborer using a variety of tools including:
  - Whipsaw types of rip saws used in the conversion of logs into timbers in a saw pit
  - felling, carpenter's, and broad axes are used in hewing.
  - Sawmill
  - Wood splitting, also called riving uses wedges, splitting mauls, and/or froes.
- Historically most timbers were used green but some went through a process of wood drying using some tools and equipment.

== Marking and measuring tools ==
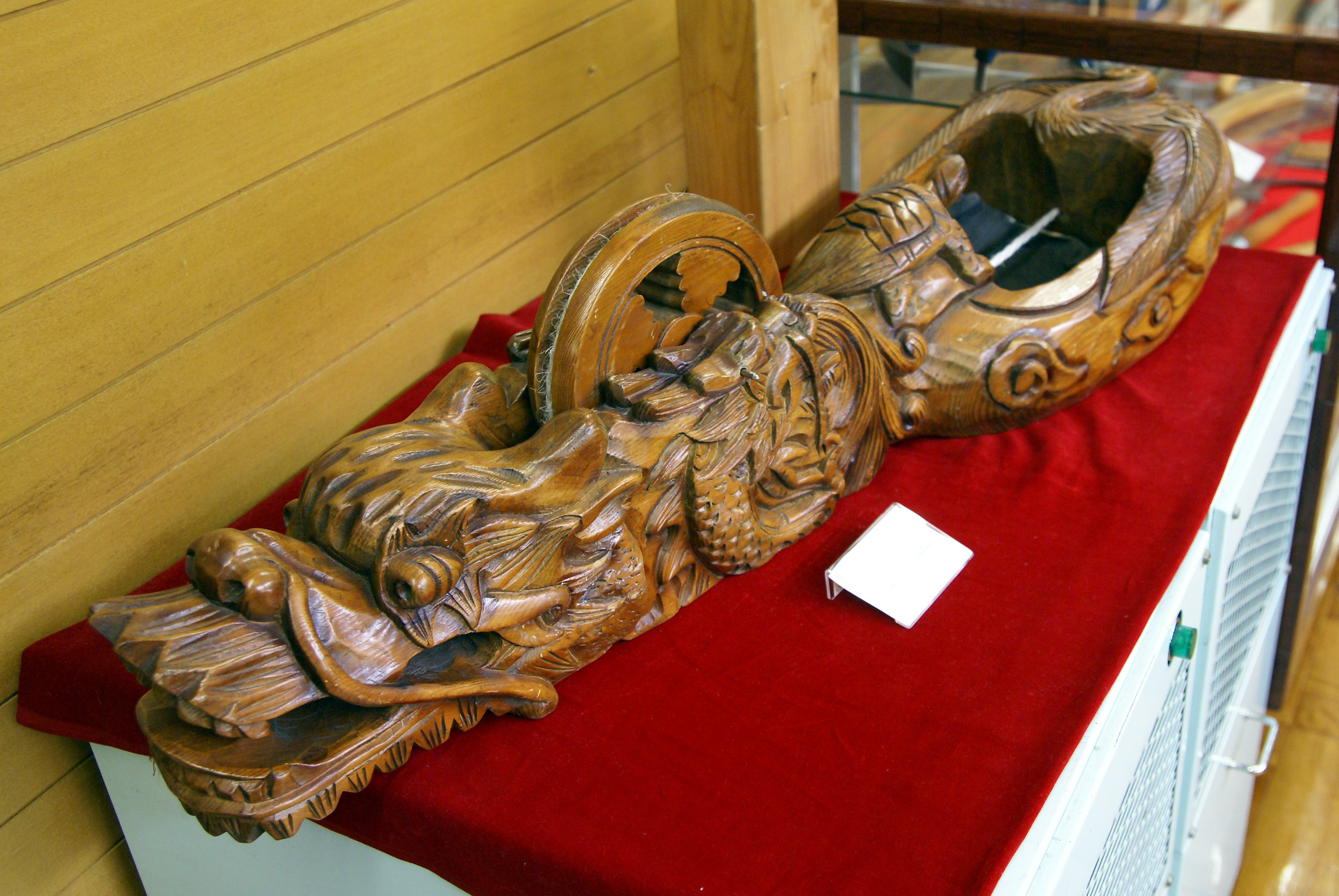
A Japanese ink line called a Sumitsubo. Miki City Hardware Museum, Japan. 10s3200

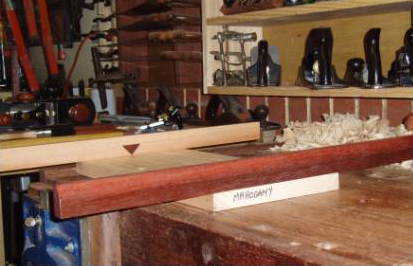
Winding sticks are used to measure twist (winding) by viewing across one stick and comparing how parallel the other stick is.

Tools for marking out and measuring:

- A rule, now better known as a ruler and similar to a yard stick, is used to measure.
- Repeated measurements often use a storey pole
- Carpenter's marks were made with a race knife, chisel, gouge, saw, grease pencil, chalk pencil, or lead pencil.
- Chalk line or ink line used to snap lines on the wood. Ink and a slurry of charcoal were used like chalk.
- Carpenter pencil
- Scratch awl or similar tools were used to scratch lines on wood before the pencil was commonly used beginning in the 19th century in the U.S.
- Try square
- Steel square is also known as a framing square. Historically a square with measurement markings on it was known as a "square rule" which is also a layout method.
- Combination square
- A Plumb-bob on a string is sometimes used with a plumb-rule or plumb-square to measure vertical or horizontal and to transfer marks between timbers while scribing.
- Spirit level
- Dividers Used in measuring and proportioning
- Layout floor - a large, flat surface to mark lines and scribe timbers.

== Hand powered cutting tools ==
- Saw
  - Crosscut saws to cut timbers to length and in making joints.
  - Japanese saws are special saws used in woodworking including timber framing
- Axes were sometimes used to cut timbers to length and in joinery.
- Hatchet
- Adzes are of many shapes and names.
- Framing Chisels are heavy duty. In Western carpentry common sizes are 1 1/2 and 2 inches wide. They are designed to be struck with a mallet
- A slick is a very large chisel designed to be pushed by hand, not struck.
- drills for boring holes in timber framing were typically T-auger. The cutting edge of the bit can be of many shapes, the spiral auger being the standard shape since the 19th century.
- Timber framers boring machines were invented by 1830 and hold an auger bit. They made mortising easier and faster.
- Draw knives are used to chamfer edges of beams and shape pegs (treenails)
- Sometimes, particularly in wooden bridge building the pegs were shaped by being driven through a hole in a heavy piece metal.
- Historically timbers meant to be seen in houses were smoothed with a hand plane (Japanese plane including what is called a spear plane, yariganna or yari-kanna) and decorated with a chamfer or bead.
- Twybil The name literally "two blades", historically rare in the U.S.
- Bisaigue A French tool with similarities to a long handled twybill

== Powered cutting tools ==
- Circular saw
- Drill
- Band saw
- Router (woodworking)
- Grinding machine
- Power planers
  - One or two sided stationary rotary, thickness planers in a shop and up to a four-sided planer (timber sizer) at a mill.
  - Hand held rotary power planers up to twelve inches wide.
- Chain mortiser
- A few modern framers use computer numerical control (CNC) machines to cut joinery.
- Chain saw

== Splitting tools ==
A Froe is struck with a mallet to split blocks of wood into rough sizes for making pegs. Large and long timbers are split (riven) with wedges

== Holding tools ==
- Shaving horse may be used in making pegs
- Draw-bore pins temporarily hold a frame together during construction.
- Iron dogs or log dogs are used to hold timers during hewing, scribing or historically to repair or reinforce a joint
- Sawhorses, short sawhorses are called ponies.

== Material handling tools and equipment ==
- Gin pole or shear legs may be used in lifting wall sections or timbers.
- Pike pole used to push wall sections up during a barn raising
- Rope is used to lift or pull objects, sometimes in combination with a windlass, bullwheel, or block and tackle.
- Cranes are sometimes used to lift assemblies and materials.
- Commander or beetel is a large, long handled mallet for forcing timbers together or apart.
- Rollers, carts, or other lifting equipment are used to move the heavy timbers

== Tool maintenance ==
Tools require sharpening and replacing handles.

- file (tool)
- sharpening stone
- Grindstone (tool)
- hiring a blacksmith
- mechanics tools for general repairs such as repairing power cords, changing bits, etc.

== Access ==
- Ladder
- Scaffolding
- Aerial work platform

== Safety ==
- Fall protection
- Hard hat
- Safety glasses
- Hearing protection
- First aid kit
