= Digging bar =

Long, straight metal bar

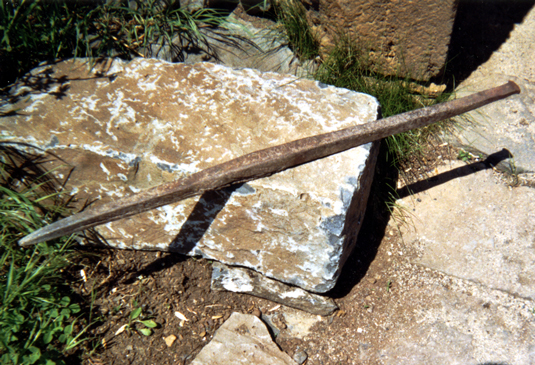
Bar with pointed and blunt end

A digging bar is a long, straight metal bar used for various purposes, including as a post hole digger, to break up or loosen hard or compacted materials such as soil, rock, concrete and ice or as a lever to move objects. Known by other names depending on structural features and intended purpose such as a hop bar or locale, such as "crowbar" in Australia and New Zealand, and slate bar, shale bar, spud bar, pinch point bar or San Angelo bar in North America, or just a bar. In Canada, it is often called pry bar.

== Uses ==
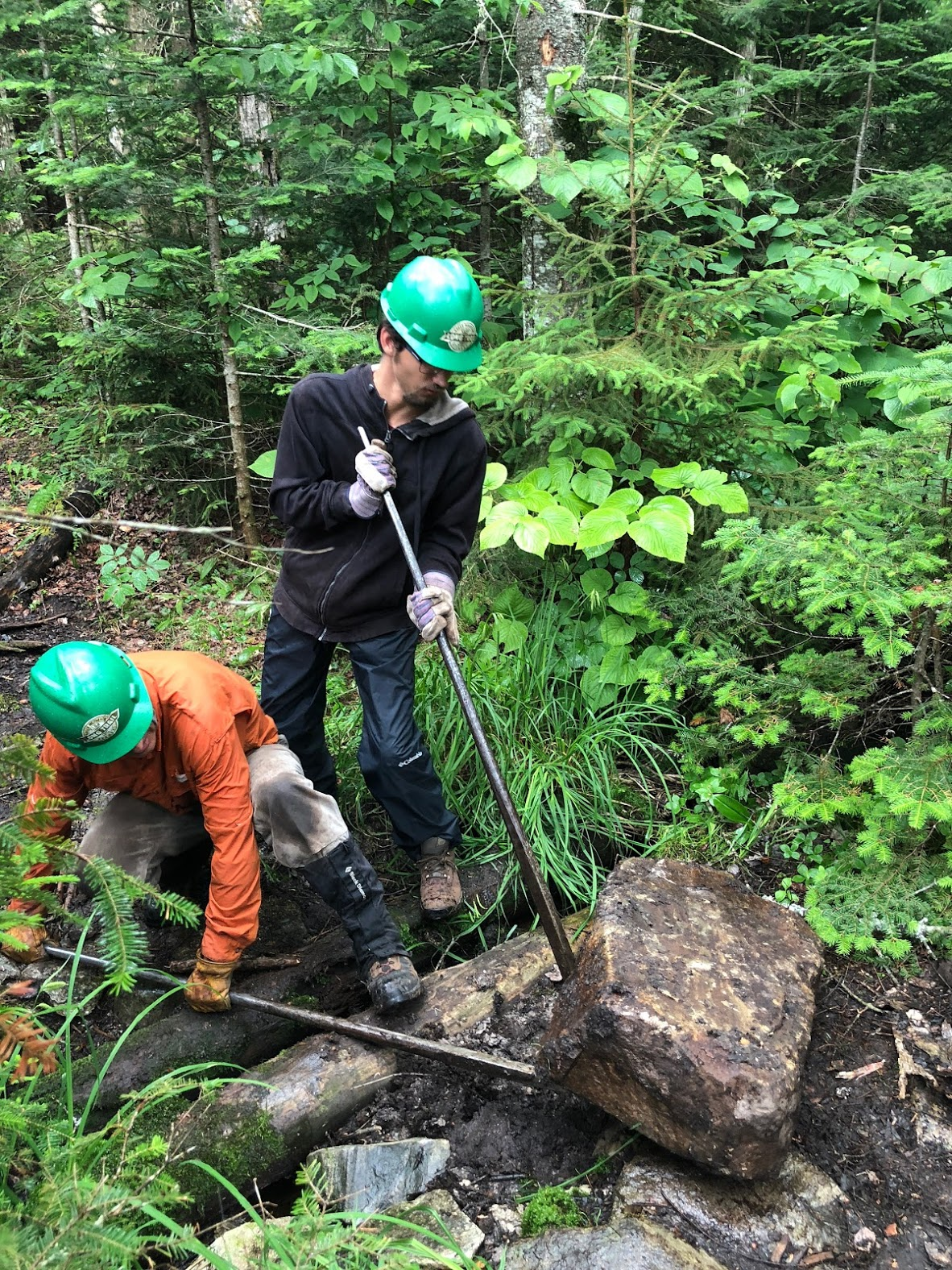
Using digging bars to move rocks

A girl and a man dig a hole with a heavy digging bar to plant a tree

Common uses of digging bars include breaking up clay, concrete, frozen ground, and other hard materials, moving or breaking up tree roots and obstacles, and making holes in the ground for fence posts. They are often used where space would not allow the use of a pickaxe. In ice fishing, spud bars are used to assess the safety of the ice, usually in the early and late seasons when ice thickness and strength can be questionable.

== Materials and construction ==
The ends of a digging bar are shaped for various purposes. Typically, each end has a different shape so as to provide two different tool functions in one tool. Common end shapes include:

- Blunt — a broad, blunt surface for tamping.
- Point — for breaking hard materials and prying.
- Wedge — an unsharpened blade for digging, breaking and prying. A San Angelo bar has a wedge at one end.
- Chisel — a sharpened blade for cutting roots, digging and prying. A pinch point bar has a chisel at one end.

Bars are typically 5 to 6 ft (1.5 to 1.8 m) long and weigh 15 to 23 lb (6.8 to 10.4 kg). They are usually made entirely of cylindrical or hexagonal forged steel with a diameter of approximately 1 in (2.5 cm). Chisel and wedge ends typically have a blade width measuring 1 to 3 in (3 to 8 cm). Blunt ends typically have a diameter of 2 to 3 in (5 to 8 cm).

== Variants ==
=== Bark spud ===
Log-peeling spuds are used to remove the bark from logs. These spuds typically have a wooden or steel handle of length 18 in (0.5 m) to over 6 ft (1.8 m). This tool is also called a Bark spud or a barking iron.

=== Hop bar ===
A hop bar (also Hop pitcher) is used to make holes in the ground for hop poles, 2 m (79 in) or more long with a heavy, bulbous spike at the digging end.

=== Ice spud ===
Fishing through holes in ice is common in many parts of the world. One of the earliest methods of cutting these holes was to use a device variously known as an ice spud or ice chisel. Many chisel variations exist, including jagged teeth, skewed edges, and different grind angles and chisel widths. Early ice spuds (before about 1925) often had wooden handles and a steel chisel fixed with a tang and collar or socket, similar to a carpenter's chisel. Ice spuds are still carried by many ice fishermen as a means to test ice thickness and safety; a single forceful thrust of the ice spud will often penetrate unsafe ice.

=== Lining bar ===
A lining bar is used to shift the alignment of railroad tracks, to manipulate some types of railroad track jacks, to "nip up" or lift ties and rails, and as a digging tool. Lining bars have a tapered form. They often have a square cross section between one and 1 1/2 inches at one end. They may have a pyramidal, wedge, or pinch point. They transition to a tapered round cross section 12 to 18 inches from the point. The handle end may terminate in a ball or may be cut off squarely at 5/8 to 3/4 inch diameter. They are made of forged steel and may be from five to six feet long. Lining bars may also be called jack bars, jack handles, or crowbars in North American railroad jargon.

=== Spud bar ===
A spud bar has a chisel at one end that is intended for removing material through a chipping or shaving action. In the British Isles these typically have a narrow, unsharpened chisel point at one end and a point at the other end, with diameters up to about 1.5 in (4 cm). Some have plastic grips on the shaft and some have wider chisel ends, or "rakes", for specific jobs such as removing old shingles and tar paper.

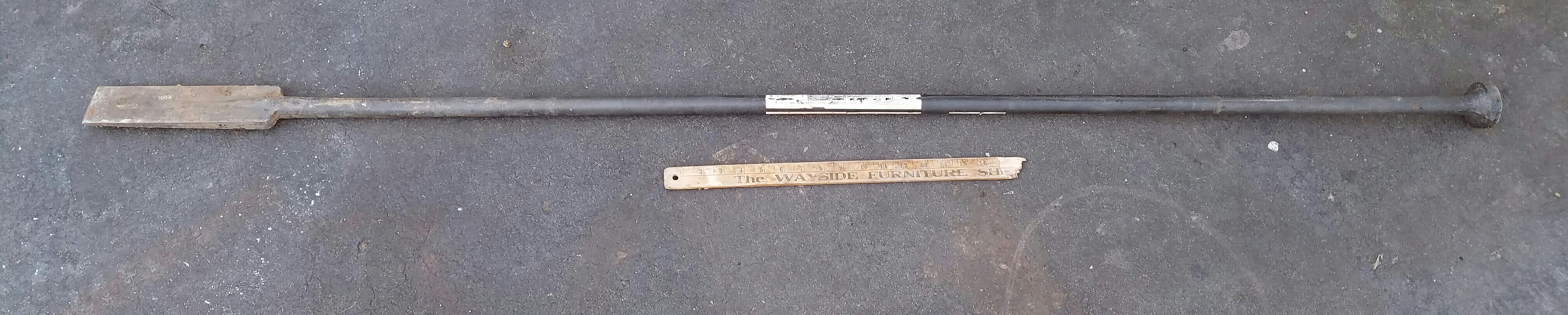
Bar with wedge and blunt end

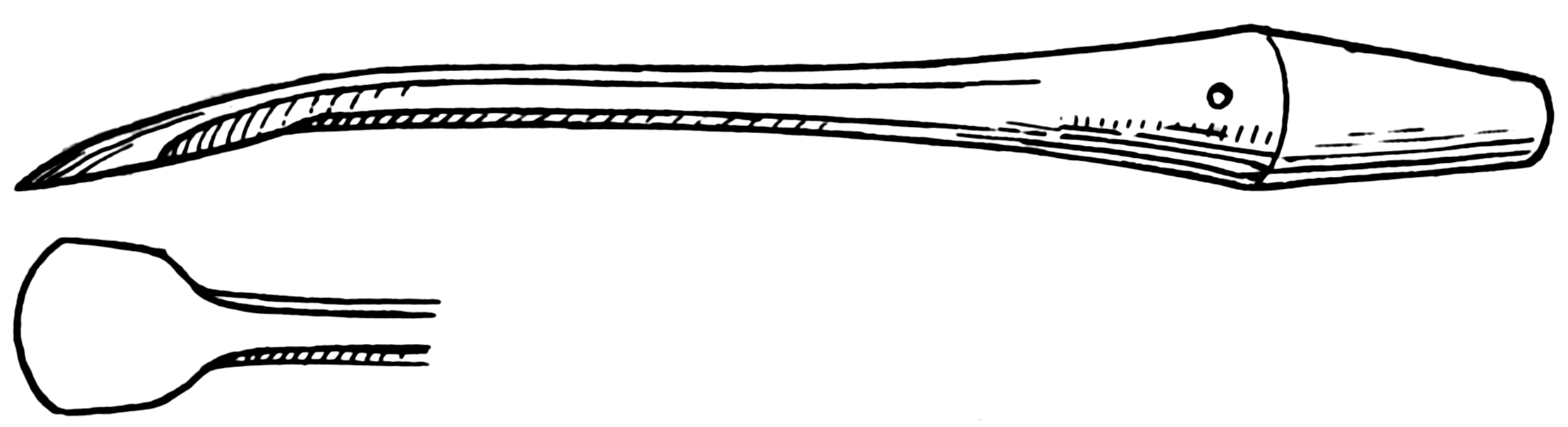
Bark spud

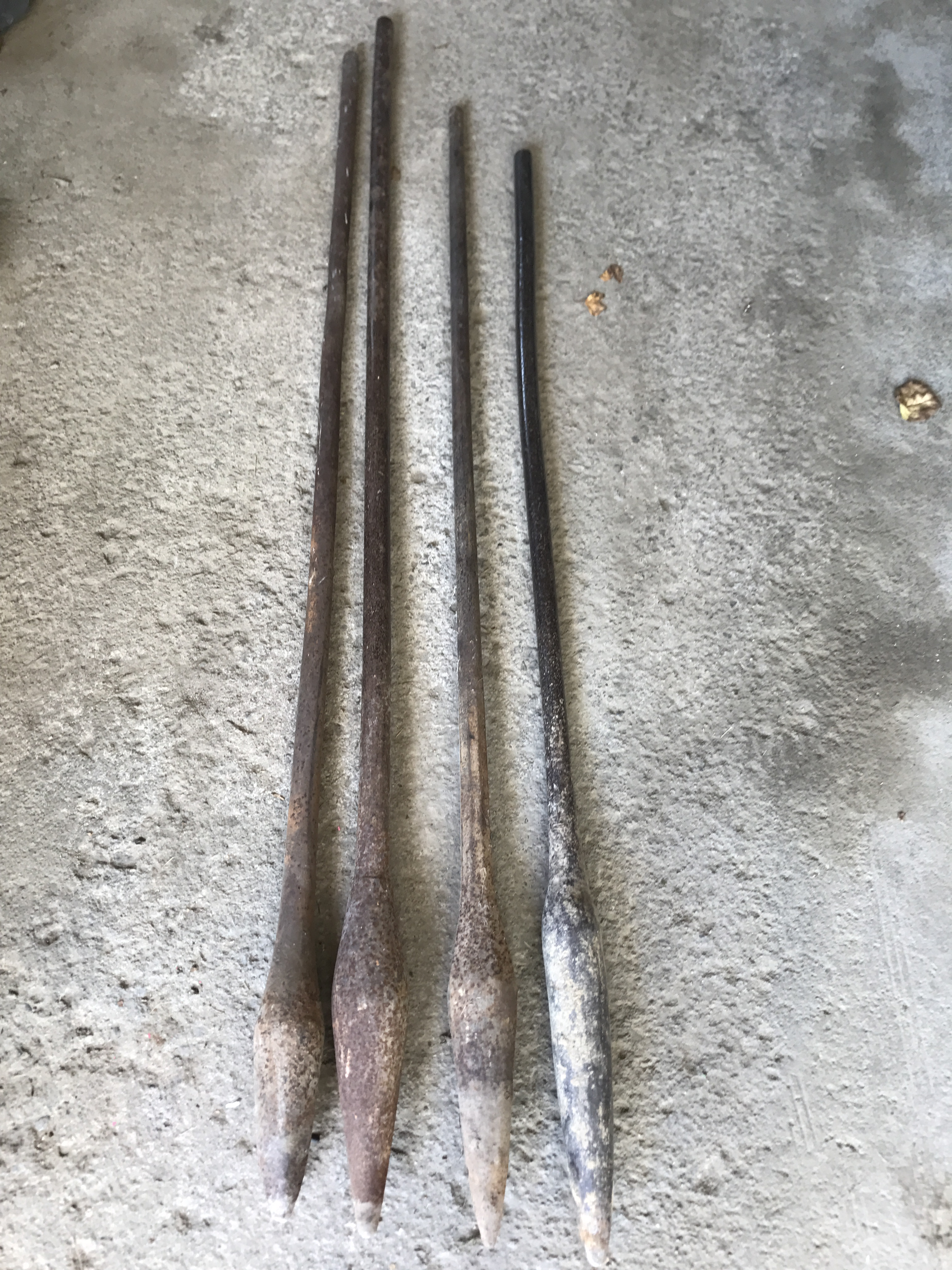
Hop bars

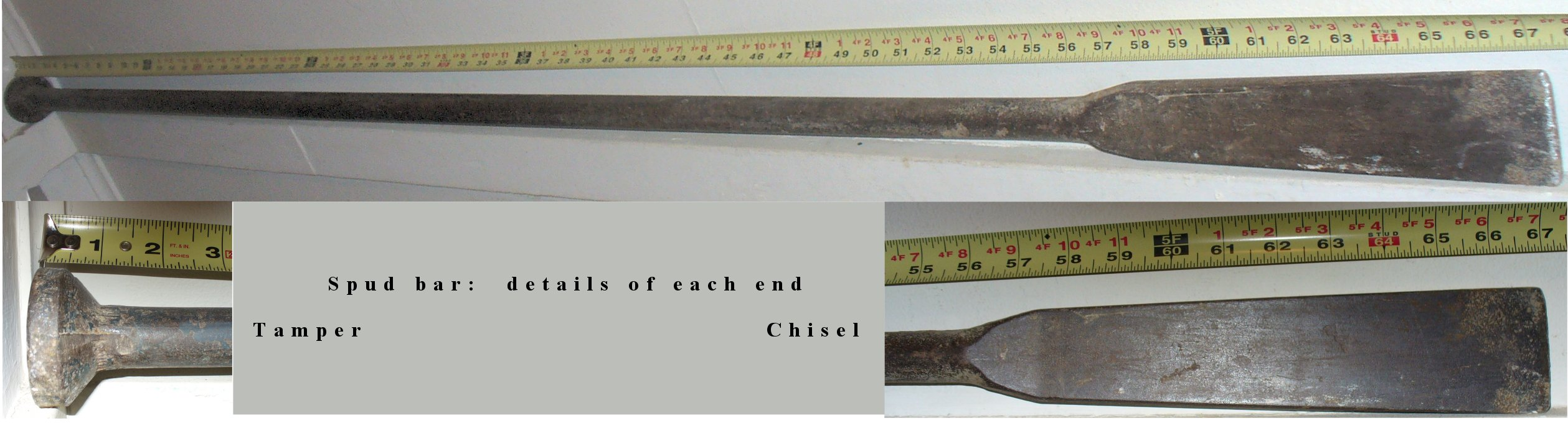
Spud bar

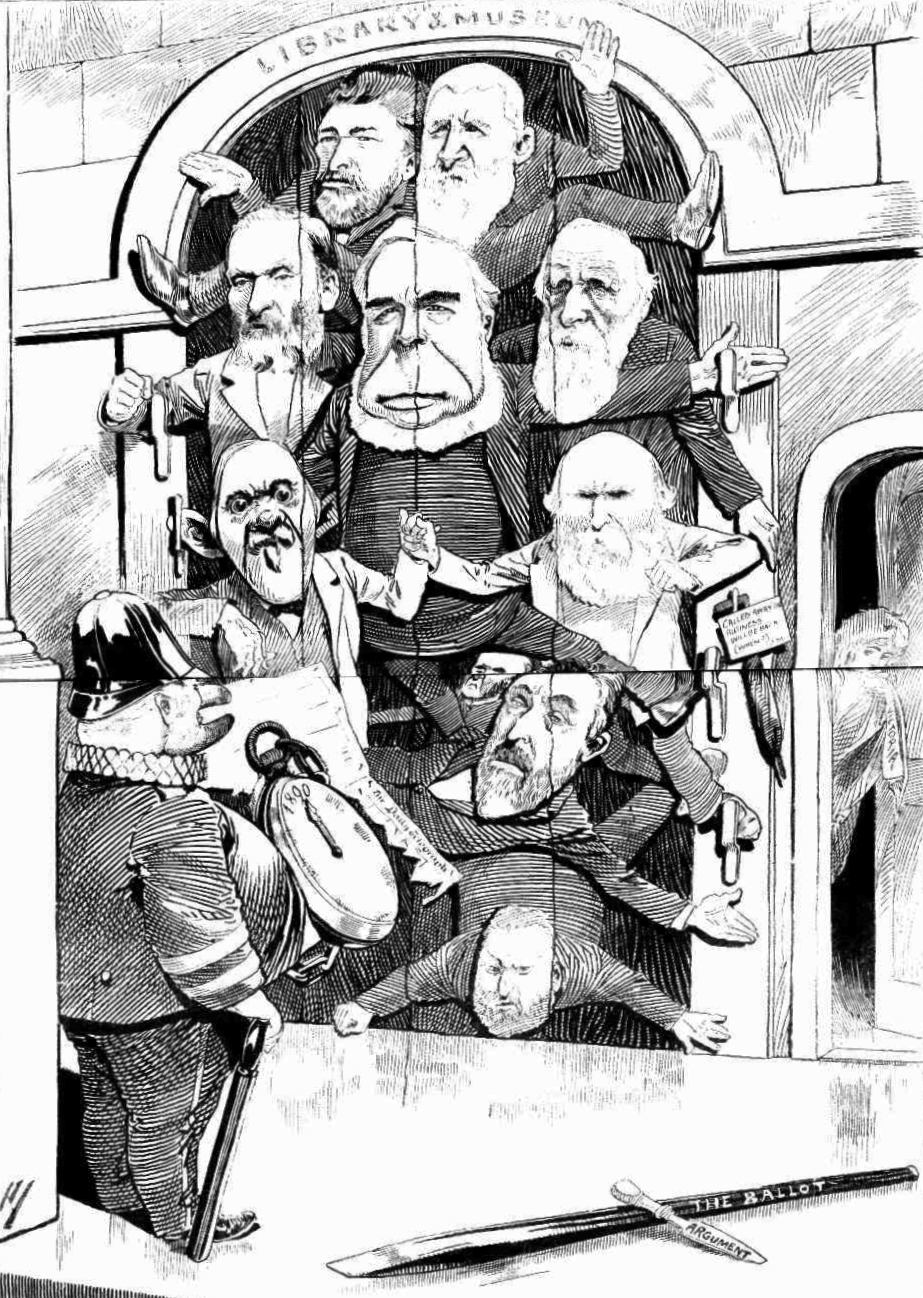
Crowbar in Australian editorial cartoon 1890

== See also ==
- Digging stick
