= Twybil =

Hand tool used for chopping out mortises in green woodworking

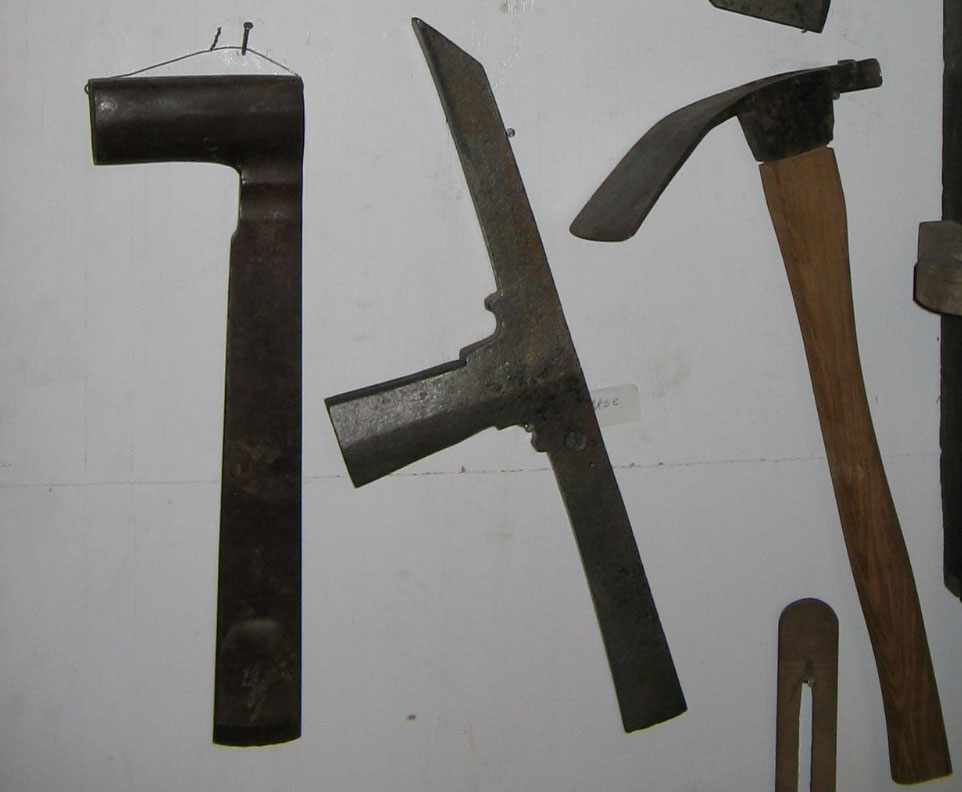
Green woodworking tools From the left to right: (1) Stichaxt or Stoßaxt, German-style mortise axe; (2) Kreuzaxt, medium-sized twybil (smaller than the larger French besaiguë; usually fitted with a short wooden handle); and (3) adze

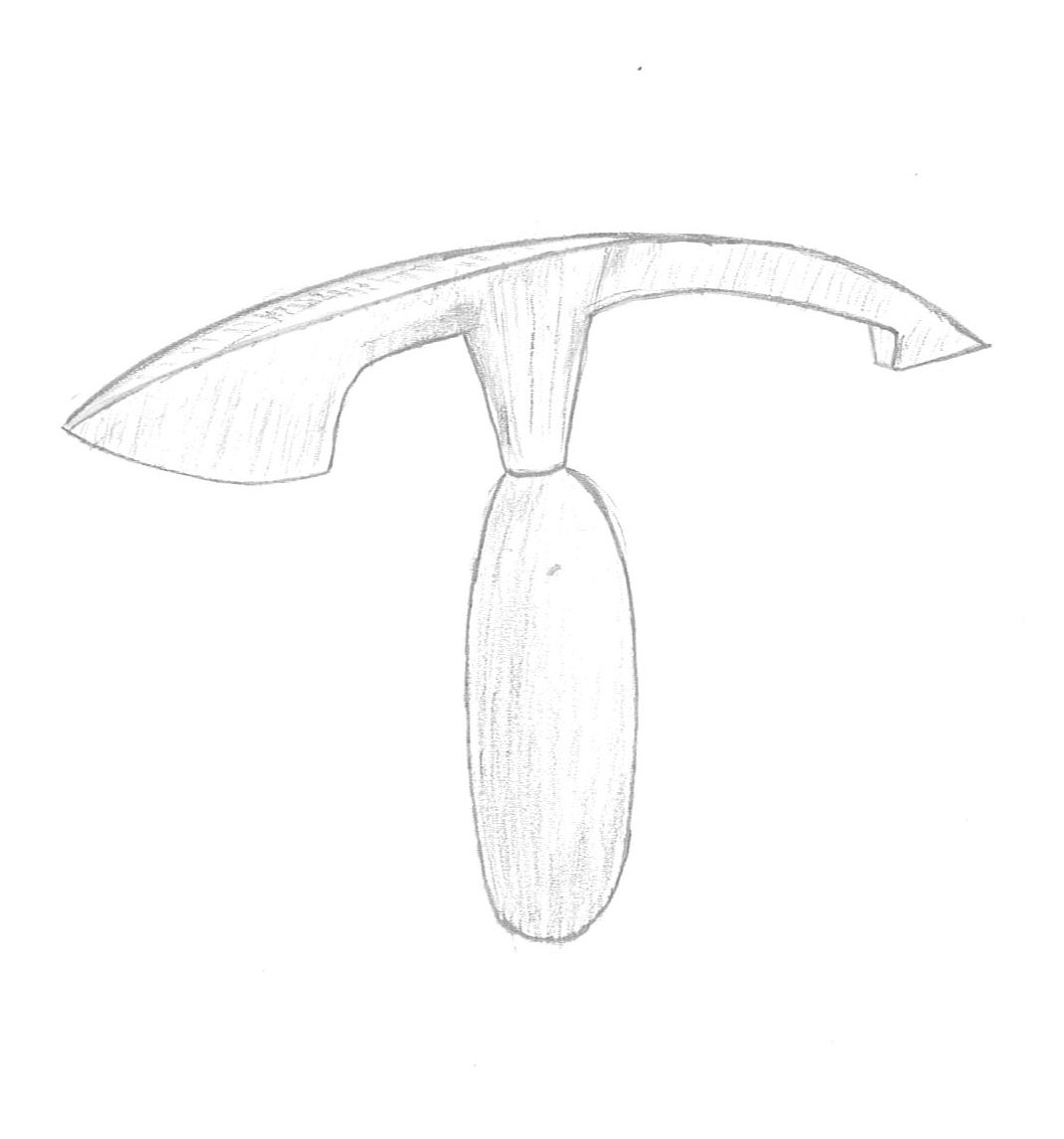
Hurdle-maker's small twybil

A twybil is a hand tool used for green woodworking. It is used for chopping out mortises when timber framing, or making smaller pieces such as gates. It combines chopping and levering functions in a single tool.

The appearance of a twybil is that of a T-shaped double-edged axe with unusually long blades and a very short handle. This appearance is deceptive, as they are actually derived from a large double-ended chisel with a side handle added for better control. The geometry of a twybil, particularly the long straight blades, makes it unworkable as an axe. Unfortunately many old examples have been damaged by such misuse. The related mortising axe is similar, but single-sided and is forged and tempered to survive the shock loads of swinging as an axe.

Twybils always have two working ends and these are always different. The first is an axe-like blade, with the edge arranged parallel to the handle. The second edge is crossways, as for an adze. This is used for prying and levering rather than cutting.

== Use ==
The correct use of a twybil is highly specialized, that of rapidly clearing out mortises. Mortises are rectangular holes used to take a tenon for several forms of joint, most obviously the common mortise and tenon joint. Mortises are always cut so that their long axis is along the grain of the wood. Traditionally these were first cut by drilling with a brace and bit to mark out each end, then the twybil used to break out the wood between them. The axe edge is used to split the intervening timber away from the sides of the mortise, then the other end to lever out the split block. Their short handle allows them to be easily flipped end-for-end, making for quick working as each blade is used alternately. This is quicker to use than swapping between a chisel and a separate lever, safer than using a carefully sharpened chisel edge for levering.

== Naming ==
The twybil has a variety of spellings and is sometimes termed the twyvil, twilbil. twivil, trybill, two-bill or even dader. In French, piochon. In Flemish and French-speaking Northern countries, they are known as bisaiguë. Their name may originate from a root of "twy-" for "two", indicating their double-ended nature, and "-bill", a common description for edged tools (e.g. "billhook"). The Oxford Dictionaries, however, define the spelling as twibill, from the Old English, twibile. Sloane distinguishes the two names with twibil as the larger straight-bladed form and twivel as the shorter, single-handed curved form.

== Construction ==
Twybils are made in a range of sizes, depending on the size of the work they're intended for. The length of the side handle remains roughly constant at around a hand's span and so their proportions change. A small one intended for making hurdles may have three arms of approximately equal length, a large framing twybil may be three feet long and yet still have the same handle. Diderot's Encyclopédie of the 18th century shows a bisaiguë in use for paring end grain of a large joint, much as a modern slick chisel, which is long enough to rest on the carpenter's shoulder.

The shape of the working edges varies with size and purpose. Large twybils have short straight edges for splitting, like an axe or tomahawk. Small ones have a more curved edge, curving back beneath to a shape that is more like a short knife or oyster knife, another tool used with a similar splitting and prying action. Both styles are forged and sharpened symmetrically. The levering end is asymmetrical, with a single bevel as for a chisel. Large framing twybils are straight, with this bevel on the outside. Small ones are curved or hooked, with the bevel inside.

Most surviving examples are old enough that they are forged from iron rather than steel, with hard steel edges welded to them. Modern examples may be wholly of steel, frequently recycled truck leaf springs. A socket is forged on the side for the handle, this being a short wooden handle, often made to the user's own preference. Twybils are rare today, even amongst the recreators of specialist green woodworking tools. As such, good usable examples may command high prices. Ashley Iles is one of the few bulk production manufacturers to offer one.

== Other related tools ==
The mortise chisel, even in its heavyweight "pigsticker" form, is used differently from a twybill, although the two may be used together. The twybill cuts the sides of mortices, along the grain. Its action is a splitting and prying one, so only requires a handle for leverage and is never struck. Mortise chisels are used for heavy chopping across the grain, are nearly always struck, and are used to square up the ends of square-ended mortises. Both tools are used for levering out chunks when first clearing out a mortise and so have similarly shaped bevels, often with a curved bevel surface for a better fulcrum action.

Slicks are other specialised chisels also used to work on the sides of mortises, but are used for final clean-up to make an accurate and smooth-sided mortise, after the rough chopping has been carried out.

In the heyday of the twybil, mortises in small work were often round-ended and so could be cut very quickly by brace and twybil alone, the tenon being rounded to fit. Only large, or high-quality work required the square ends and smoothed sides of a precise mortise, trimmed by this variety of chisels.

The apprentice will often use all three mortising tools interchangeably and randomly, making much effort of removing the waste as small chips. The skilled framer uses each appropriately in turn, working faster, with less effort and not bothering to tear a large block of waste into fragments. They are also less likely to damage a precise edge by levering with a sharp, brittle chisel edge.
