= Corner chisel =

Woodworking chisel used for cutting inside corners

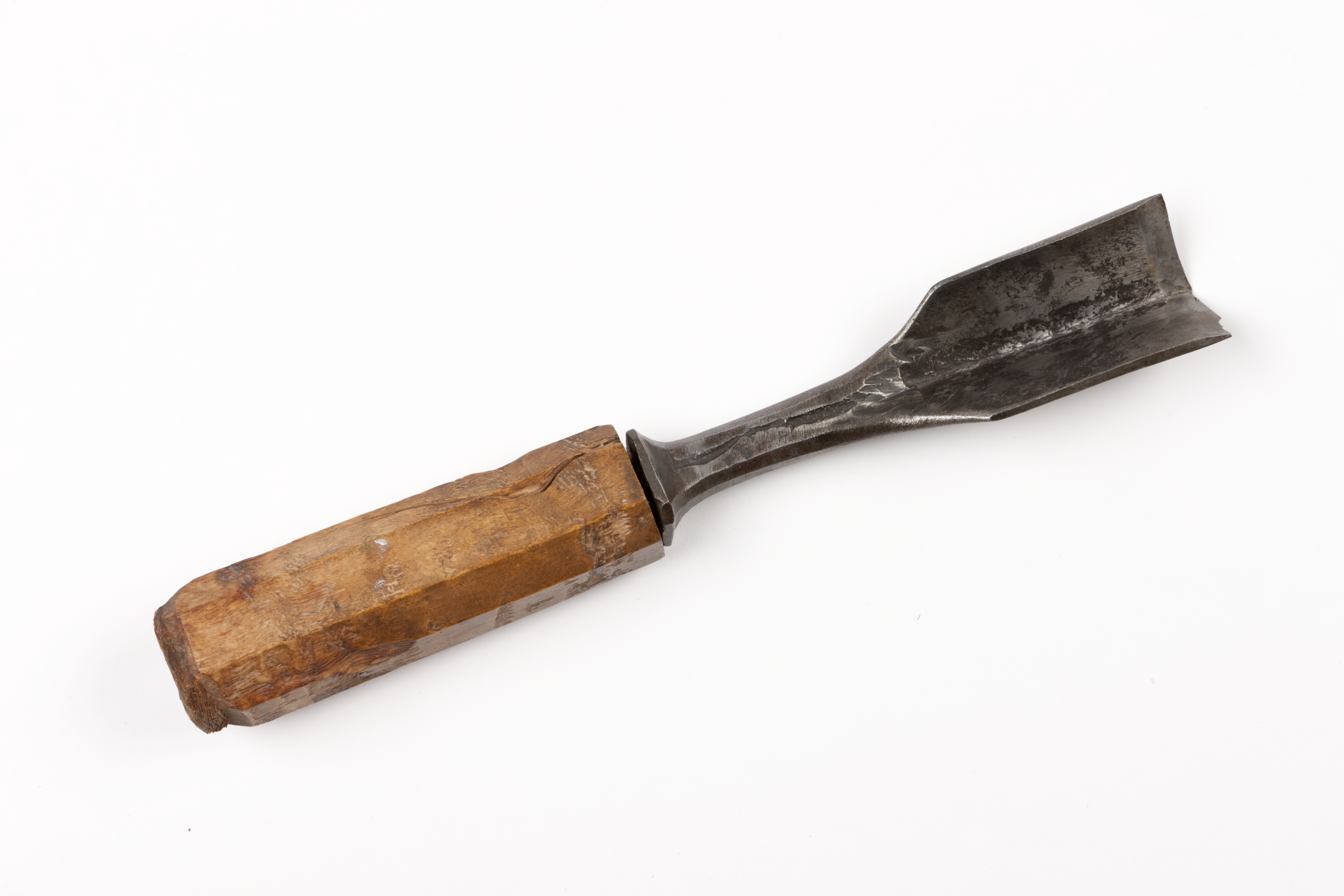
- Other names: Bruzz chisel
- Classification: Wood chisel
- Used with: Mallet

A corner chisel is a tool for cutting sharp internal corners in wood, often used for mortise joints or hinge rebates. The hole will typically be cut by a router, or occasionally drilled, leaving rounded corners. The function of the corner chisel is therefore similar to the square mortising chisel used on a mortising machine.
