= Race knife =

Knife with a U-shaped end

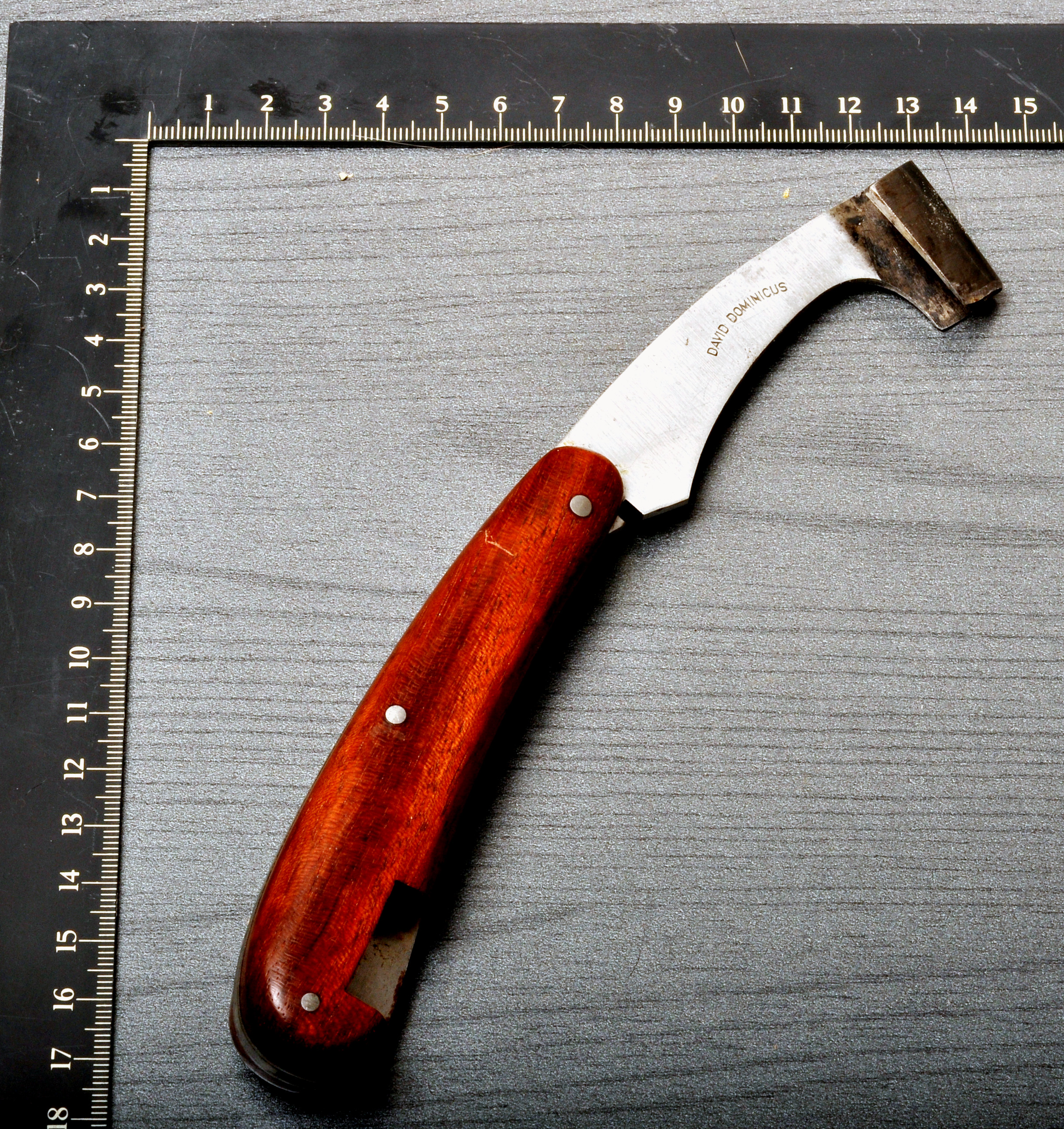
A folding race knife

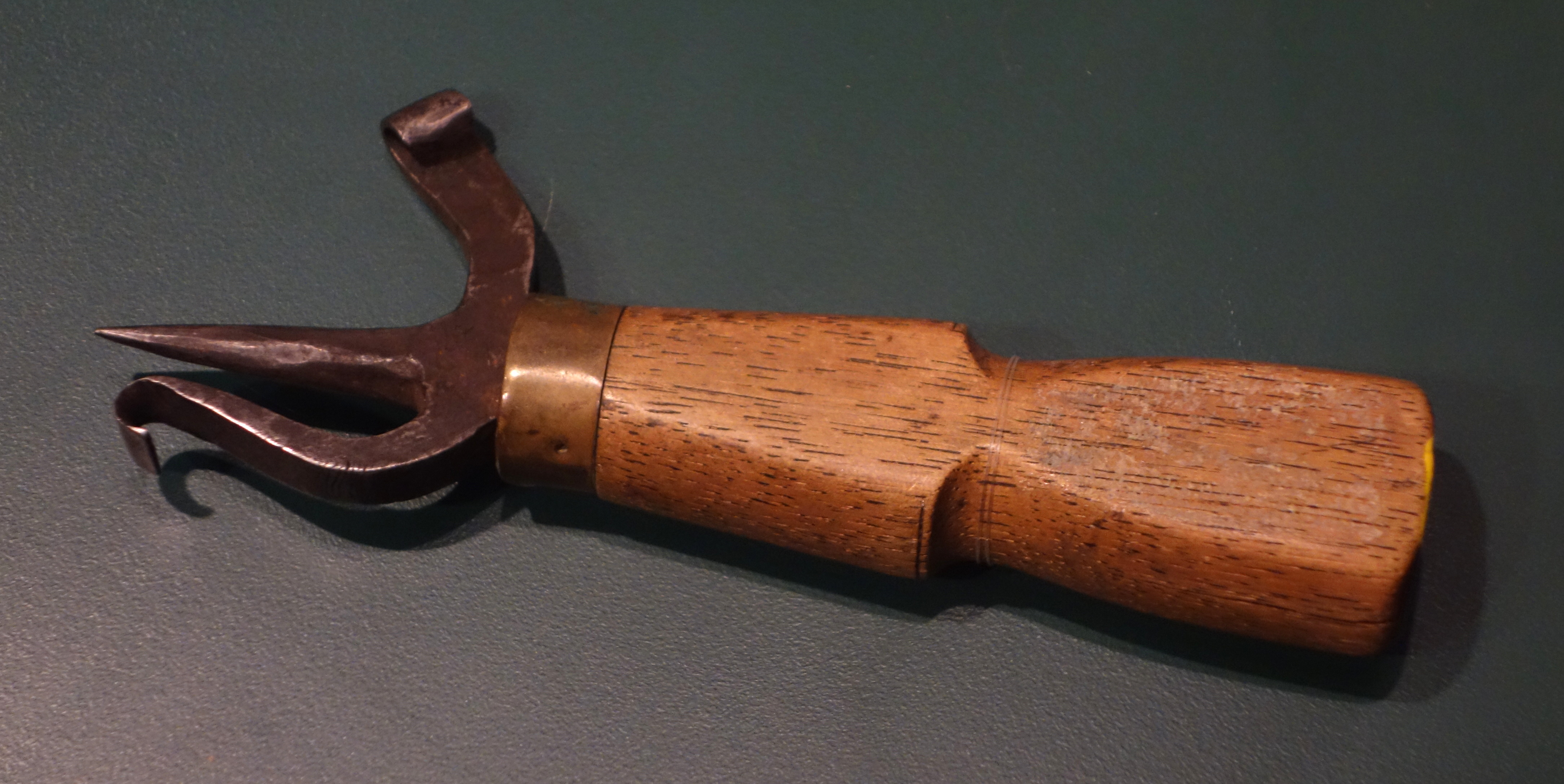
Race knife used by surveyor John Woodlock to cut distinctive marks in witness trees, 1850-1867 - Wisconsin Historical Museum - DSC03281

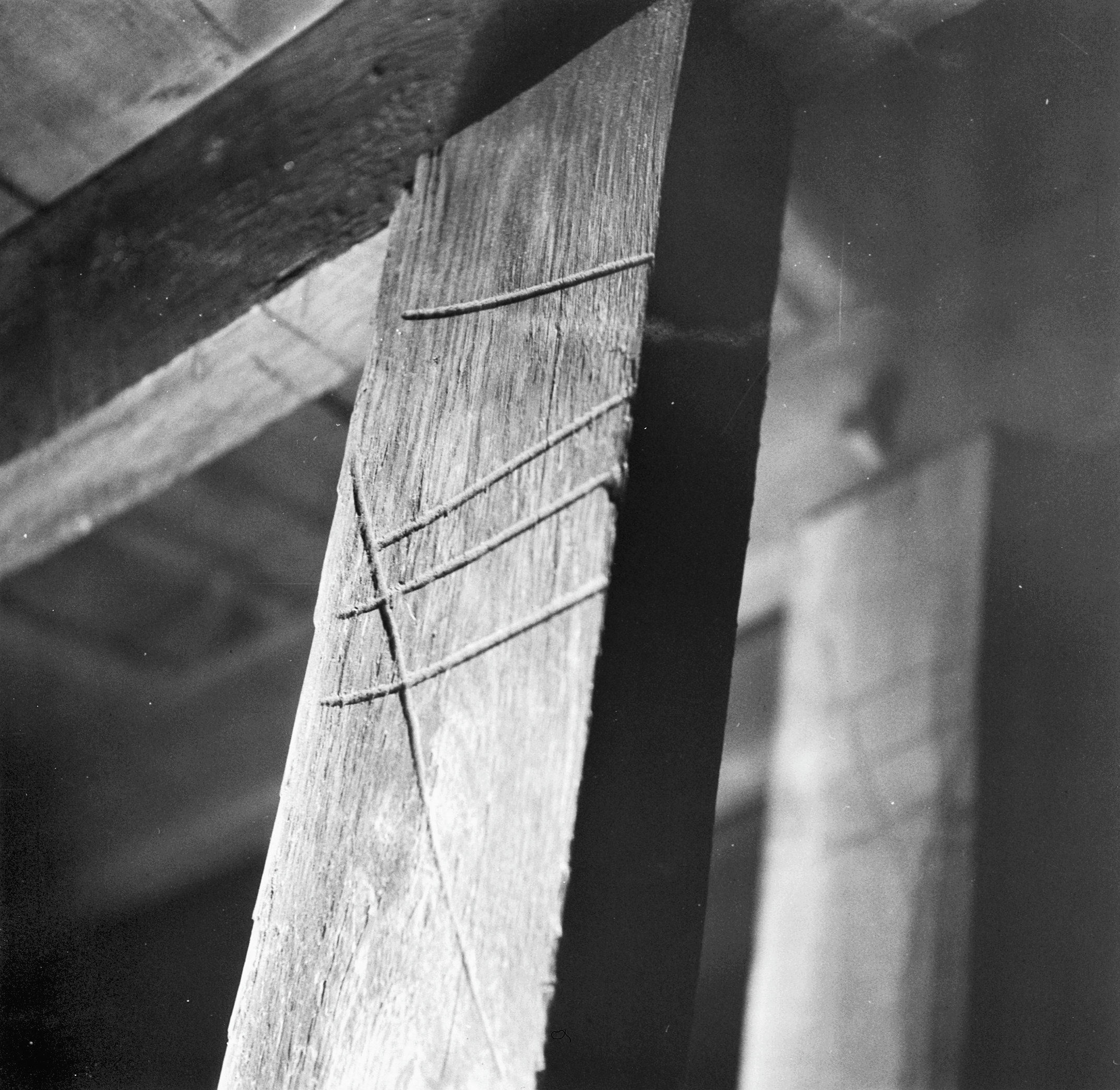
A common example of carpenter's marks made with a race knife- Amsterdam - 20377790 - RCE

Race knife also known as a timber scribe (scorer, tree marker) is a knife with a U-shaped end sometimes called a scoop knife for cutting marks in wood by lumbermen, carpenters, coopers, surveyors, and others. The reasons for making marks varies and includes keeping count (tally marks), identifying parts (carpenter's marks), numbering, and tracing patterns around a template as a part of marking out. The gouges left by the timber scribe are more durable than pencil or chalk marks.

Two basic forms of race knife are a simple, fixed or folding, scooped blade and a scooped blade paired with a point around which the blade cut a circle or partial circle. The circles and partial circles allowed more variety in the patterns of marks rather than only using Roman numeral-like marks.

The numbering with a race knife resembles Roman numerals but the number four is usually marked IIII rather than IV and nine VIIII rather than IX because the four and nine could be mistaken for a six or eleven.

== See also ==
- Masons mark
