= Chisel =

Tool for cutting and carving

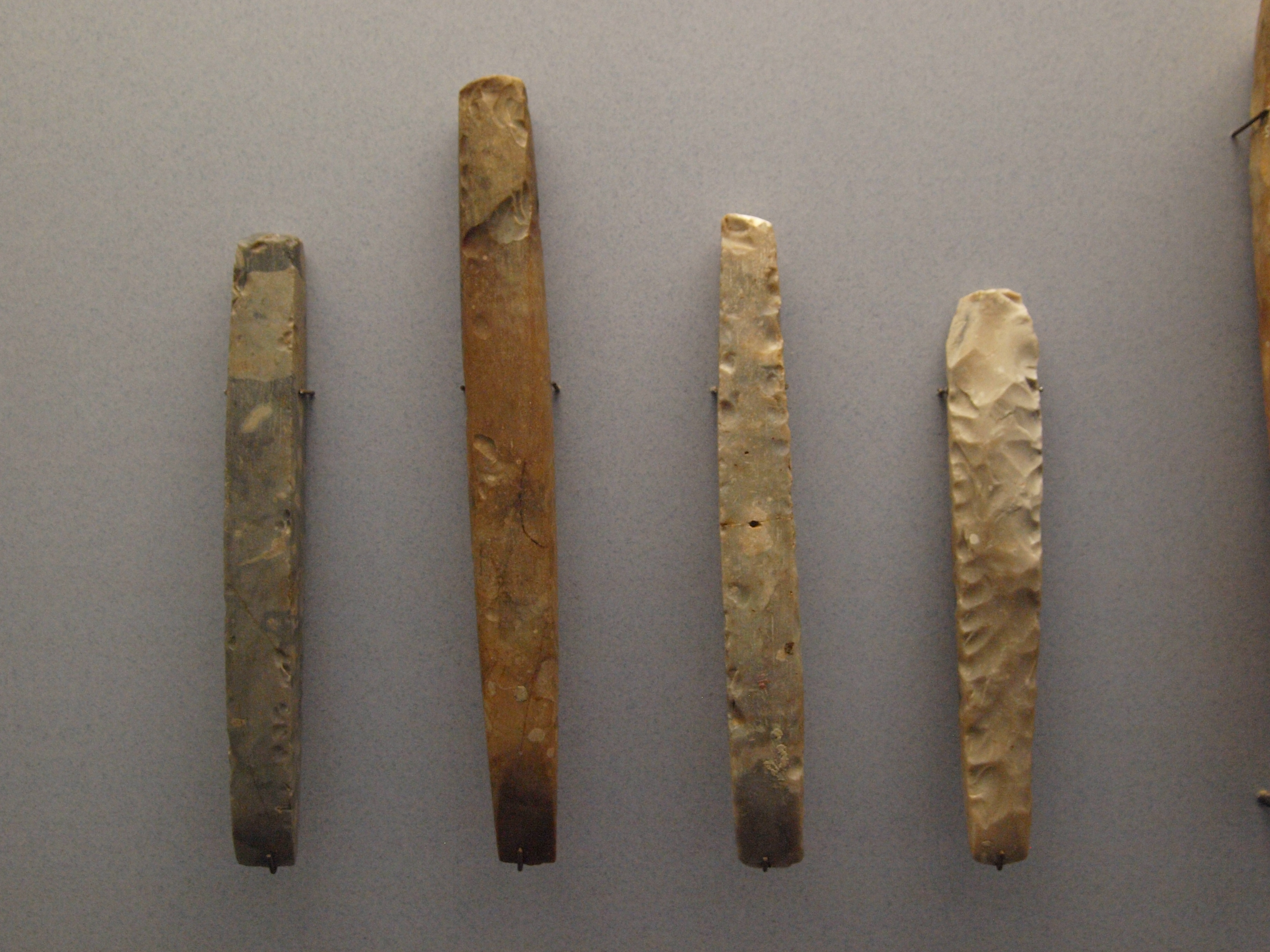
Neolithic stone chisels from Schleswig-Holstein, Germany around 4100 to 2700 BCE

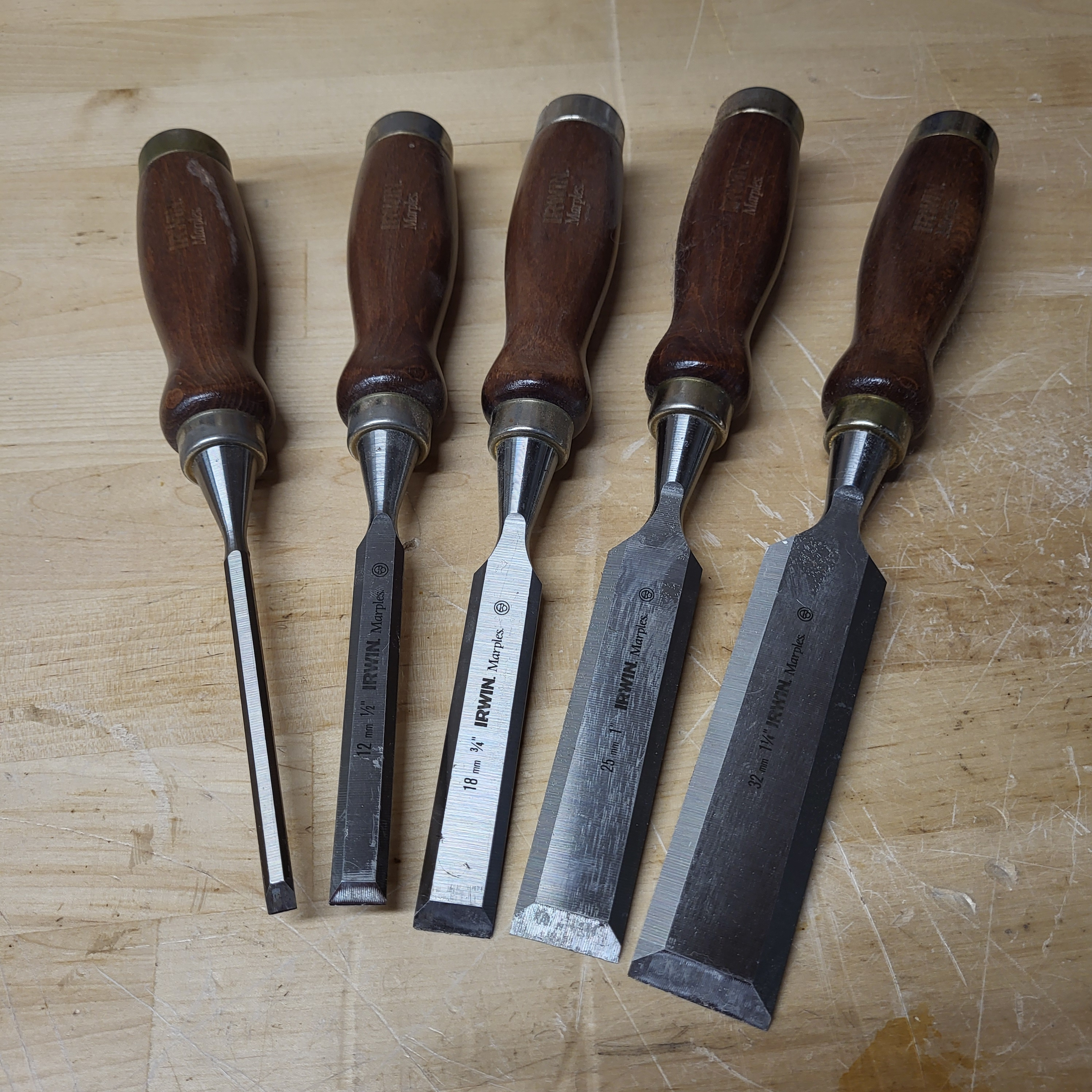
A selection of modern wood chisels

A chisel is a hand tool with a characteristic wedge-shaped cutting edge on the end of its blade. A chisel is useful for carving or cutting a hard material such as wood, stone, or metal.

Using a chisel involves forcing the blade into some material to cut it. The driving force may be applied by pushing by hand, or by using a mallet or hammer. In industrial use, a hydraulic ram or falling weight ('trip hammer') may be used to drive a chisel into the material.

A gouge is a type of chisel that serves to carve small pieces from the material; particularly in woodworking, woodturning and sculpture.

== Woodworking ==
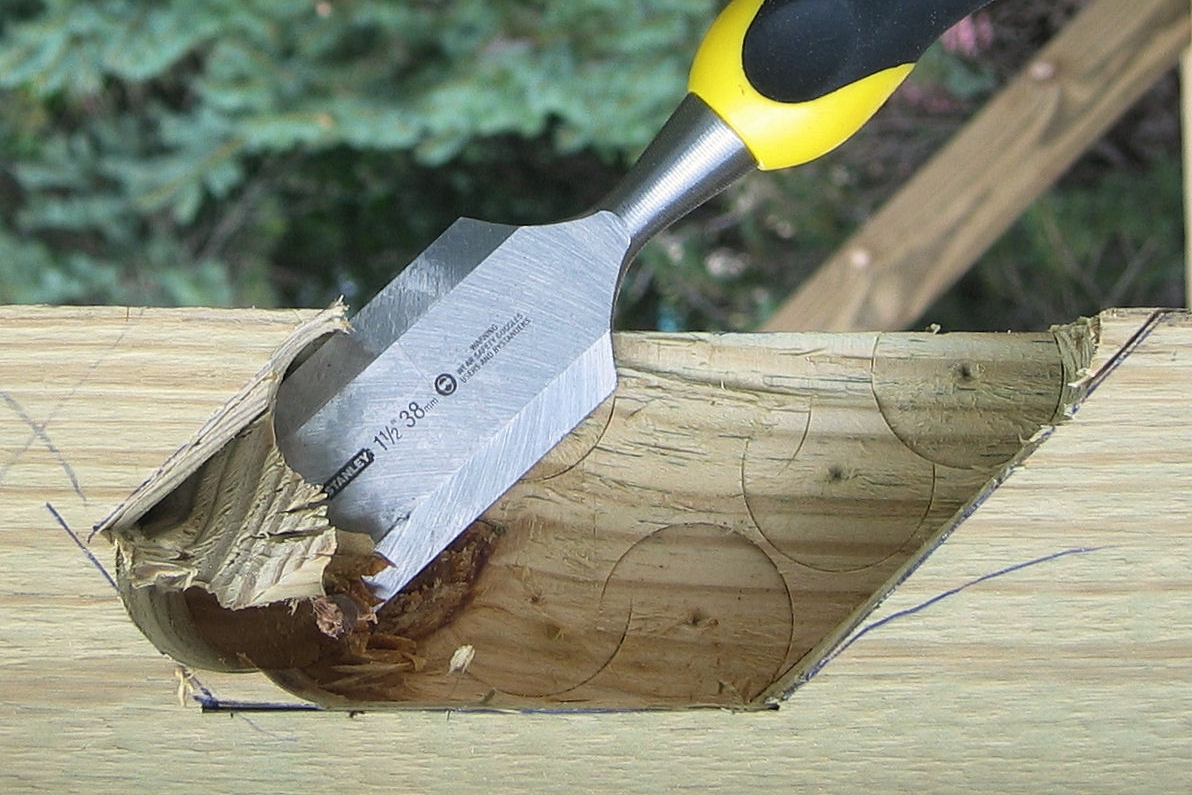
A sharp wood chisel in combination with a forstner wood drill bit is used to form this mortise for a half-lap joint in a timber frame.

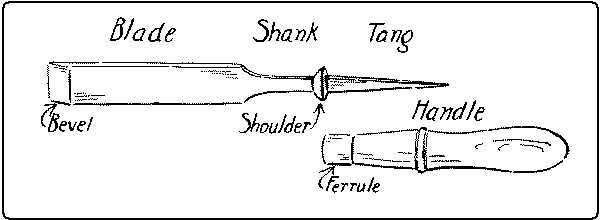
Parts of a wood chisel

Woodworking chisels range from small hand tools for tiny details, to large chisels used to remove big sections of wood, in 'roughing out' the shape of a pattern or design. Typically, in woodcarving, one starts with a larger tool, and gradually progresses to smaller tools to finish the detail. One of the largest types of chisel is the slick, used in timber frame construction and wooden shipbuilding. There are many types of woodworking chisels used for specific purposes, such as:

Firmer chisel
has a blade with a thick rectangular cross section, making them stronger for use on tougher and heavier work.
Bevel edge chisel
can get into acute angles with its bevelled edges.
Mortise chisel
thick, rigid blade with straight cutting edge and deep, slightly tapered sides to make mortises and similar joints. Common types are registered and sash mortice chisels.
Paring chisel
has a long blade ideal for cleaning grooves and accessing tight spaces.
Skew chisel
has a 60 degree cutting angle and is used for trimming and finishing across the grain on a wood lathe.
Dovetail chisel
made specifically for cutting dovetail joints. The difference being the thickness of the body of the chisel, as well as the angle of the edges, permitting easier access to the joint.
Butt chisel
short chisel with beveled sides and straight edge for creating joints.
Carving chisels
used for intricate designs and sculpting; cutting edges are many; such as gouge, skew, parting, straight, paring, and V-groove.
Corner chisel
resembles a punch, and has an L-shaped cutting edge. Cleans out square holes, mortises and corners with 90 degree angles.
Flooring chisel
cuts and lifts flooring materials for removal and repair; ideal for tongue-and-groove flooring.
Framing chisel
usually used with mallet; similar to a butt chisel, except it has a longer, slightly flexible blade.
Slick
a very large chisel driven by manual pressure, never struck.
Drawer lock chisel
an all metal chisel with two angled blades used for tight spaces such as cutting out the space for fitting a desk drawer lock.

== Lathe tools ==
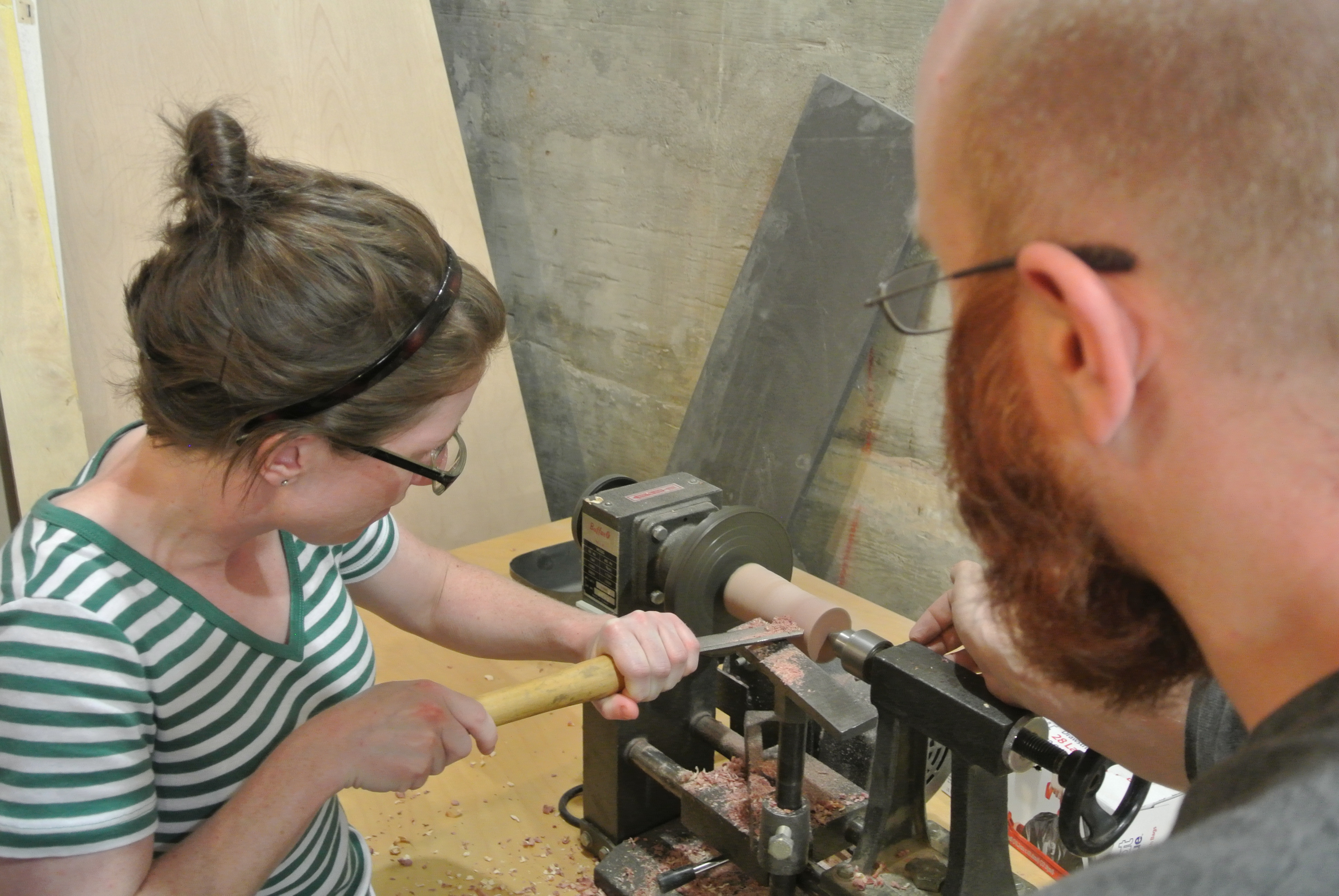
Woodturning with a long handled chisel

Woodturners use a woodworking gouge or chisel designed to cut wood as it is spun on a lathe. These tools have longer handles for more leverage, needed to counteract the tendency of the tool to react to the downward force of the spinning wood being cut or carved. In addition, the angle and method of sharpening is different.

== Metalworking ==
Chisels used in metal work can be divided into two main categories: hot chisels and cold chisels.

=== Cold chisel ===
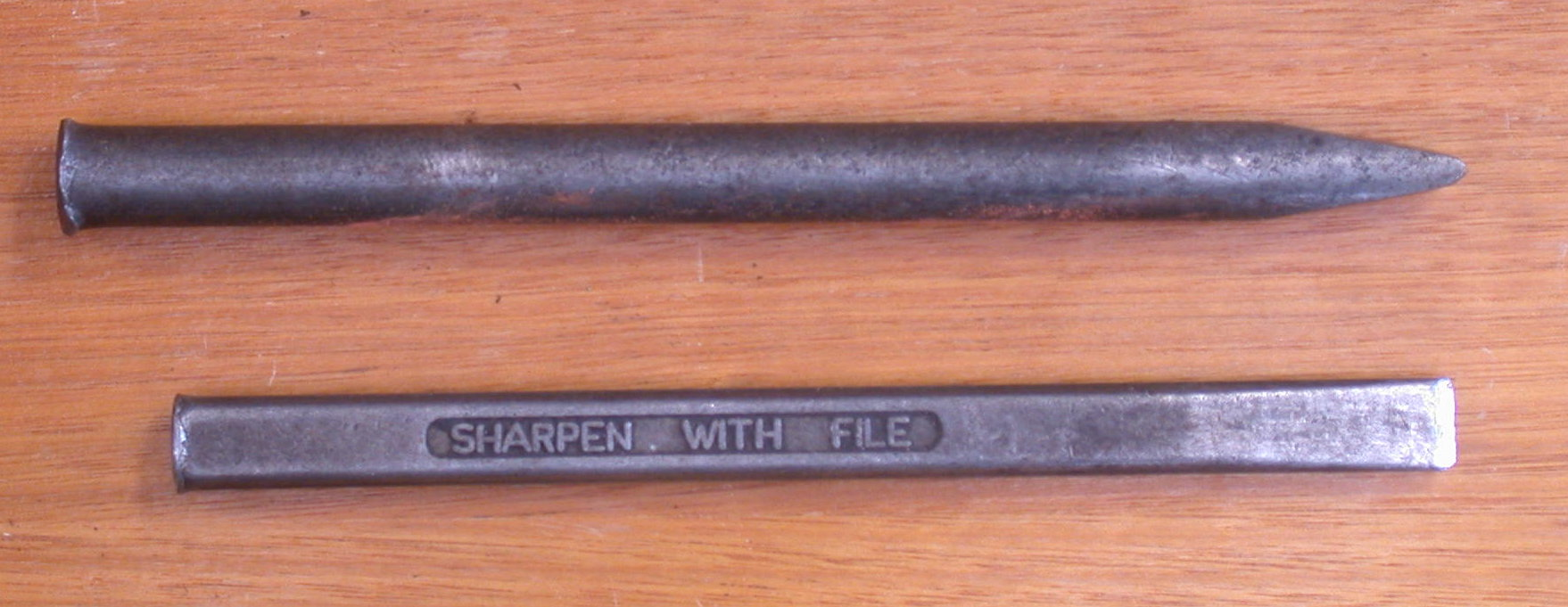
Top: Bull point chisel Bottom: Cold chisel

A cold chisel is a tool made of tempered steel used for cutting 'cold' metals, meaning that they are not used in conjunction with heating torches, forges, etc. Cold chisels are used to remove waste metal when a very smooth finish is not required or when the work cannot be done easily with other tools, such as a hacksaw, file, bench shears or power tools.

Cold chisels have a less-acute angle to the sharp portion of the blade than woodworking chisels. This gives the cutting edge greater strength at the expense of sharpness.

Cold chisels come in a variety of sizes, from fine engraving tools that are tapped with very light hammers, to massive tools that are driven with sledgehammers. Cold chisels are forged to shape and hardened and tempered to a blue colour at the cutting edge.

The head of the chisel is chamfered to slow down the formation of the mushroom shape caused by hammering and is left soft to avoid brittle fracture splintering from hammer blows.

There are four common types of cold chisels:

1. The flat chisel, the most widely known type, is used to cut bars and rods, to reduce surfaces, and to cut sheet metal that is too thick or difficult to cut with tin snips.
2. The cross cut chisel is used to cut grooves and slots. The blade narrows behind the cutting edge to provide clearance.
3. The round nose chisel is used to cut semi-circular grooves for oil ways in bearings.
4. The diamond point chisel is to clean out corners or difficult places. It is also useful for "pulling over" centre punch marks wrongly placed for drilling.

Although the vast majority of cold chisels are made of steel, a few are manufactured from beryllium copper, for use in special situations where non-sparking tools are required.

Cold chisels are predominantly used in repoussé and chasing processes for the fabrication of bronze and aluminium sculptures.

=== Hot chisel ===
A hot chisel is used to cut metal that has been heated in a forge to soften the metal. One type of hot chisel is the hotcut hardy, which is used in an anvil hardy hole with the cutting edge facing up. The hot workpiece to be cut is placed over the chisel and struck with a hammer. The hammer drives the workpiece into the chisel, which allows it to be snapped off with a pair of tongs. This tool is also often used in combination with a "top fuller" type of hotcut, when the piece being cut is particularly large.

== Stone ==
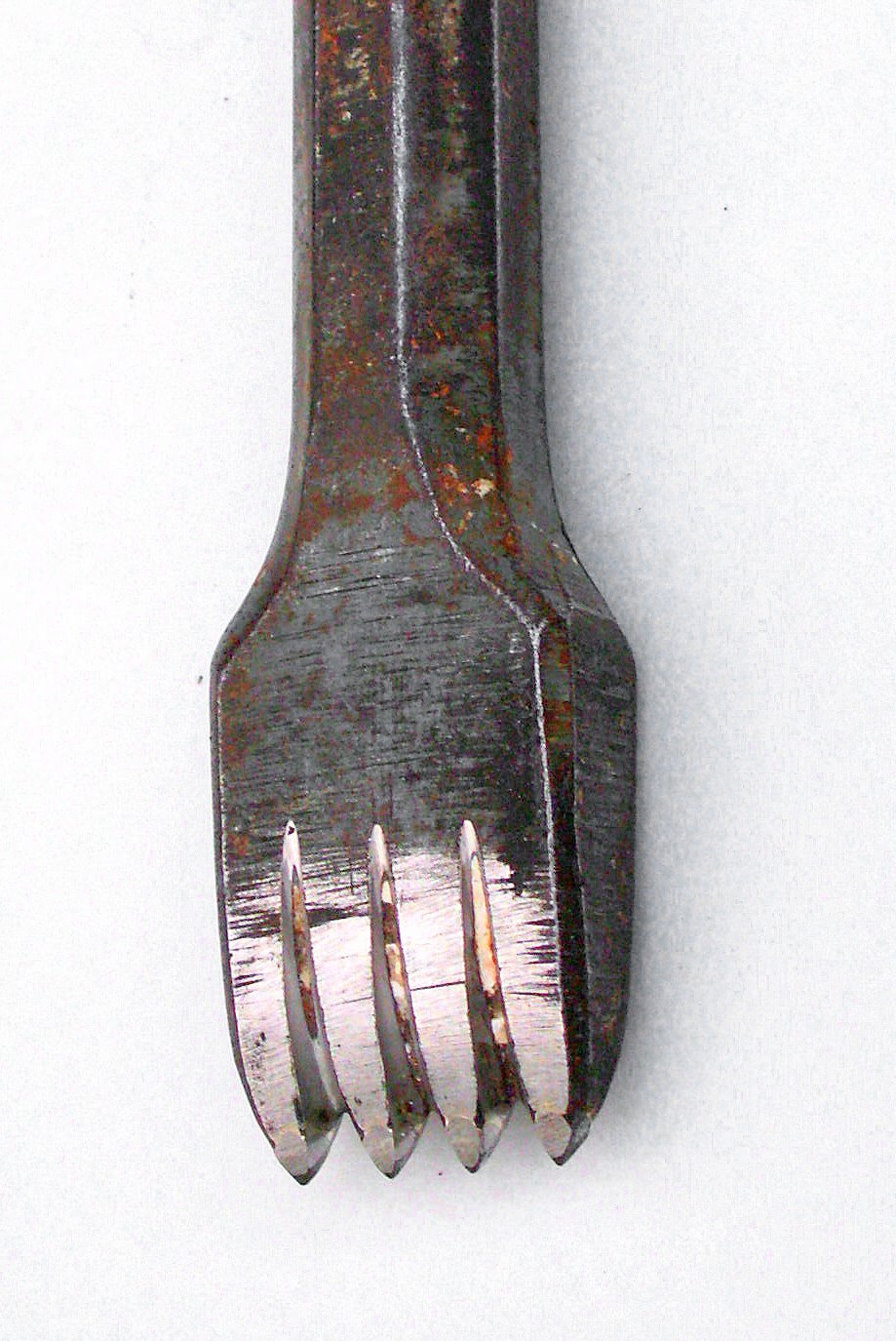
A toothed stone chisel, used by stone sculptors and stonemasons

Stone chisels are used to carve or cut stone, bricks or concrete slabs. To cut, as opposed to carve, a brick bolster is used; this has a wide, flat blade that is tapped along the cut line to produce a groove, then hit hard in the centre to crack the stone. Sculptors use a spoon chisel, which is bent, with the bevel on both sides. To increase the force, stone chisels are often hit with club hammers, a heavier type of hammer.

== Masonry ==
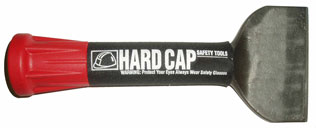
A bolster chisel

Masonry chisels are typically heavy, with a relatively dull head that wedges and breaks, rather than cuts. Often used as a demolition tool, they may be mounted on a hammer drill, jackhammer, or hammered manually, usually with a heavy hammer of three pounds or more. These chisels normally have an SDS, SDS-MAX, or 1-1/8" Hex connection. Types of masonry chisels include the following:

- Moil (point) chisels
- Flat chisels
- Asphalt cutters
- Carbide bushing tools
- Clay spade
- Flexible chisels
- Tamper

A plugging chisel has a tapered edge for cleaning out hardened mortar. The chisel is held with one hand and struck with a hammer. The direction of the taper in the blade determines if the chisel cuts deep or runs shallow along the joint.

== Leather ==
In leather work, a chisel is a tool used to punch holes in a piece leather. The chisel has between one and seven (or possibly more) tines that are carefully placed along the line where the holes are desired, and then the top of the chisel is struck with a hammer until the tines penetrate the leather. They are then withdrawn, and the leather worker then stitches through the resulting holes.

== Gouge ==
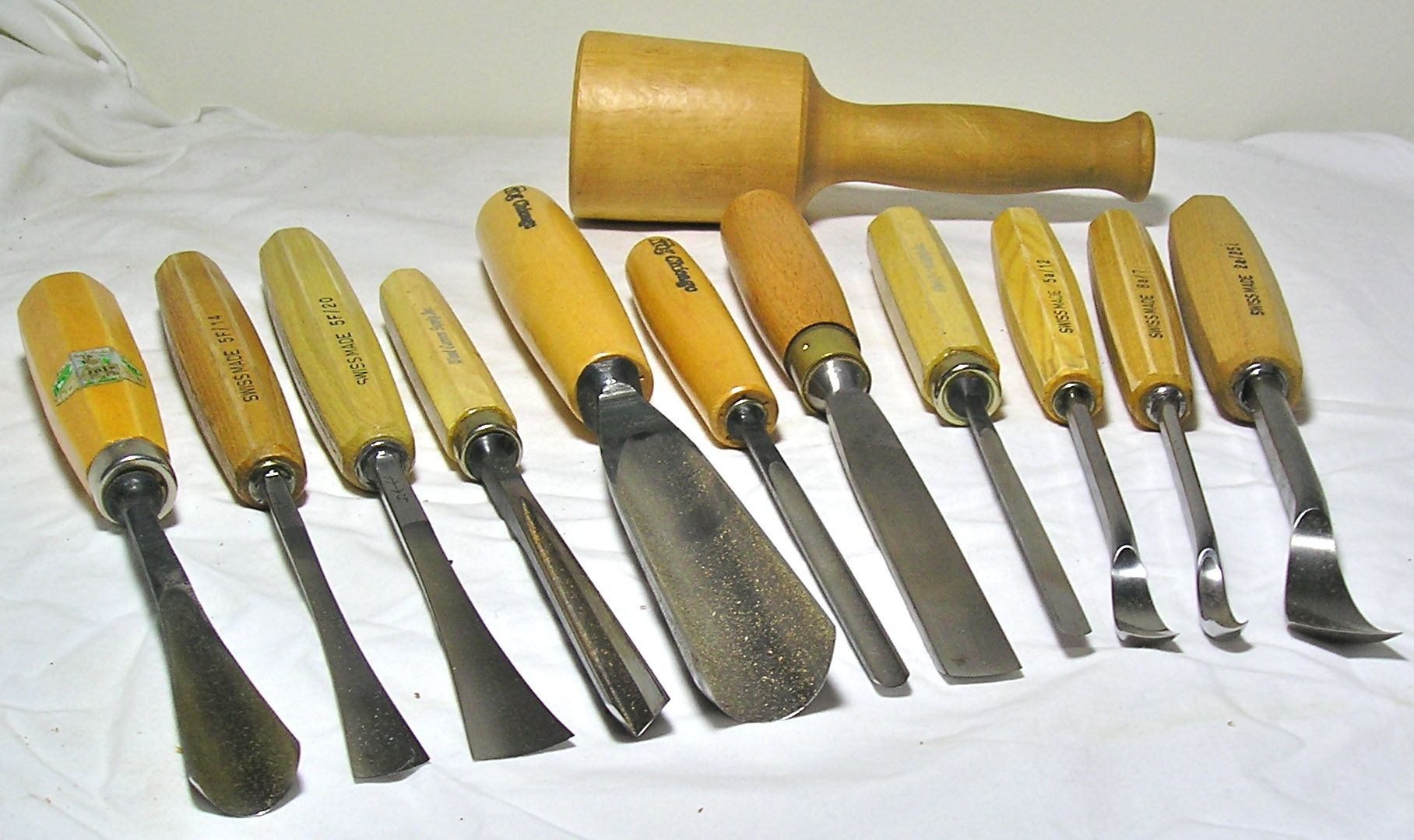
Different gouges and a wooden mallet

A modern gouge is a specialized kind of chisel where the blade is curved or angled in cross-section, rather than flat. The modern version is generally hafted inline, the blade and handle typically having the same long axis. If the bevel of the blade is on the outer surface of the curve the gouge is called an 'outcannel' gouge, otherwise it is known as an 'incannel' gouge. Gouges with angled rather than curved blades are often called 'V-gouges' or 'vee-parting tools'.

The blade geometry is defined by a semi-standardized numbering system that varies by manufacturer and country of origin. For each gouge a "sweep number" is specified that expresses the part of a circle defined by the curve of the blade. The sweep number usually ranges from #1, or flat, up to #9, a semi-circle, with additional specialized gouges at higher numbers, such as the U-shaped #11, and a v-tool or parting tool, which may be an even higher number such as #41. In addition to sweep, gouges are also specified by the distance from one edge of the blade to the other (this corresponds to the chord of the circle section defined by the edge of the blade). Putting these pieces together, two numbers are used to specify the shape of the cutting edge of a gouge, such as a '#7-20mm'. Some manufacturers provide charts with the sweeps of their blades shown graphically.

In addition to varying blade sweeps, bevels, and widths, blade variations include:

- 'Crank-neck' gouges, in which the blade is offset from the handle by a small distance, to allow working flat to a surface
- 'Spoon-bent' gouges, in which the blade is curved along its length, to allow working in a hollow not otherwise accessible with a straight bladed gouge
- 'Fishtail' gouges, in which the blade is very narrow for most of its length and then broadens out near the working edge, to allow working in tight spaces.

All of these specialized gouges allow a craftsperson to cut into areas that may not be possible with a regular, straight-bladed gouge.

The cutting shape of a gouge may also be held in an adze, roughly as the shape of a modern-day mattock.

Gouges are used in woodworking and arts. For example, a violin luthier uses gouges to carve the violin, a cabinetmaker may use it for running flutes or paring curves, or an artist may produce a piece of art by cutting some bits out of a sheet of linoleum (see also Linocut).

Gouges were found at a number of historic Bronze Age hoards found in Great Britain.

== See also ==
- Air hammer – a pneumatic version of a chisel
- Burin – a steel tool for engraving
- Digging bar – a metal rod to dig and break up materials and use as a lever
- Slick – A large chisel which is pushed rather than struck

== Bibliography ==
- Reader's Digest Book of Skills & Tools ISBN 0-89577-469-0
