= Bark spud =

Implement used to remove bark from felled timber

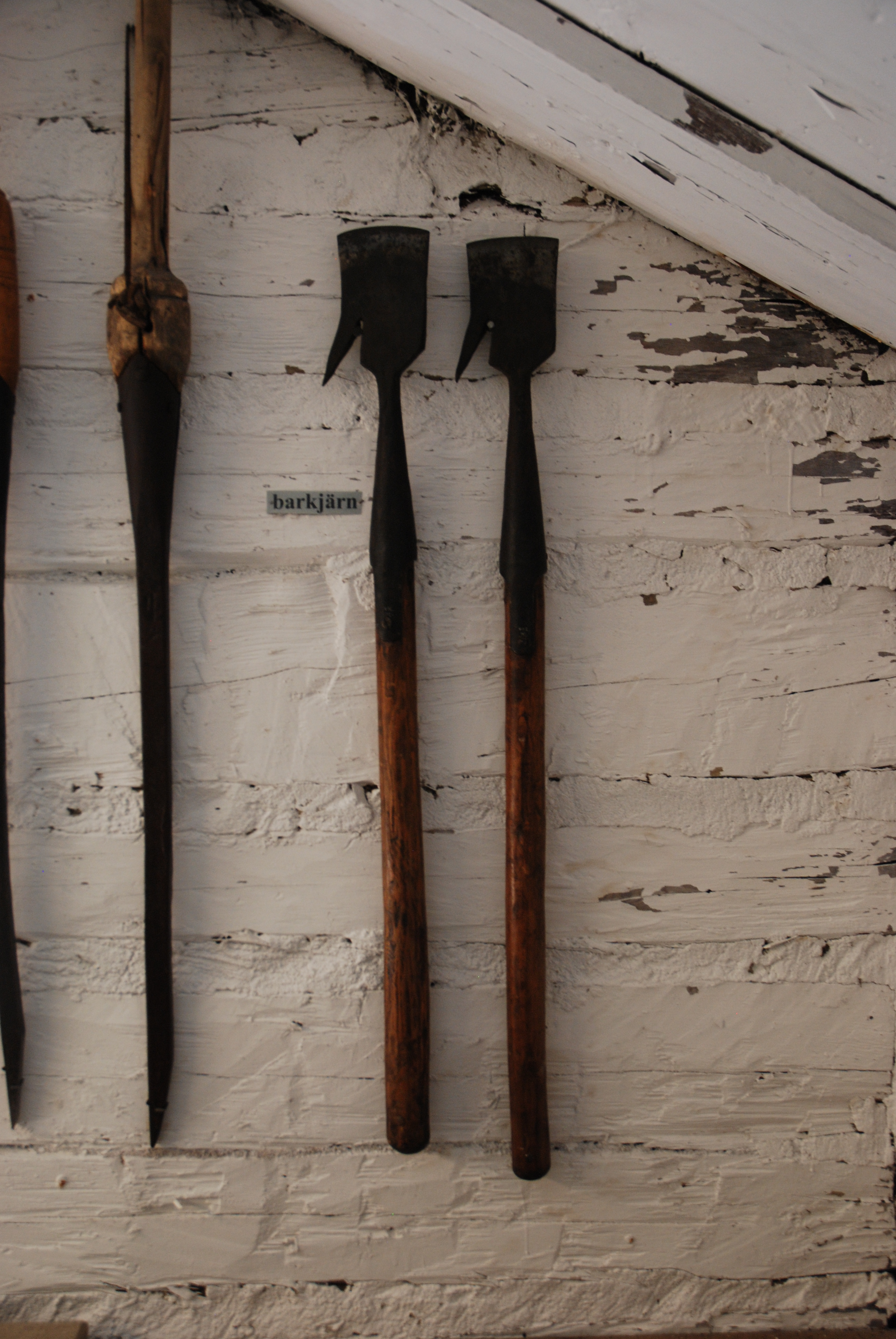
Swedish bark spuds

The bark spud (also known as a peeling iron, peeler bar, peeling spud, or abbreviated to spud) is an implement which is used to remove bark from felled timber.

== Construction ==
Most bark spuds have steel heads and wooden handles, typically hickory or ash. The head is curved, sometimes in one direction with a single cutting edge, and sometimes more dish shaped and sharpened on three sides.

== Method of use ==
Removal of bark and cambium from a spruce with a bark spud (Kõrvemaa, Estonia, 2026)

In use, the sharpened edge is slid between the bark and the wood, removing the bark from the tree in a number of strips. It is especially useful at removing bark without damaging the wood below the bark.

== Similar tools ==
A coa de jima is a similar specialized tool for harvesting agaves. The drawknife also removes bark from felled trees.
