= Post hole digger =

Tool used to dig vertical holes in soil

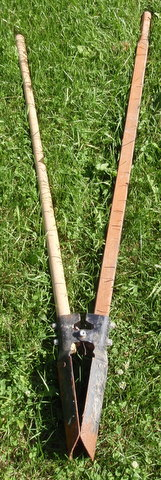
Closed post hole digger

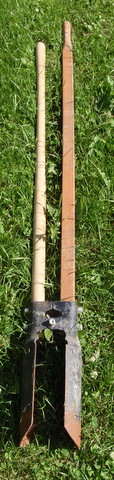
Open post hole digger

A post hole clam-shell digger, also called post hole pincer or simply post hole digger, is a tool used to dig holes in the ground, typically from a few inches to about a foot in diameter, for general purposes such as setting fence and sign posts, or planting saplings.

== Description ==
The tools consists of two articulated shovel-like blades, forming an incomplete hollow cylinder about a foot long and a few inches wide, with two long handles that can put the blades in an "open" (parallel) position or a "closed" (convergent) position.

== Operation ==
In operation, the tool is jabbed into the ground with the blades in the open position. The handles are then operated to close the blades, thus grabbing the portion of soil between them. The tool is then pulled out and the soil is deposited by the side of the hole. The process is repeated until the cavity is deep and wide enough. Sometimes dry or sandier soils will not stay secured in the clams, so water is added to make the soil adhere, or an alternative tool is used instead.

== Comparison with earth augers ==
An earth auger is another tool that is used to dig holes in the ground, consisting of a rotating shaft with one or more blades attached at the lower end. A hand-powered auger is generally easier to use than a clam-shell digger, and can in principle dig deeper and remove more dry, sandy soils. It naturally creates a round and straight hole, but only of a fixed diameter. The shovel like shape of a clam-shell-type digger allows it to be used to dig holes of any shape and any diameter greater than that of the open blades.

== History and patent info ==
Clam-shell-type pole diggers seem to be a relatively recent invention, newer than earth augers. A patent was filed by J. Lawry of Lenoir City, Tennessee in 1908. The patent has the traditional clam-shell design with an extra spike in the center.
