= Slick (tool) =

Large chisel which is pushed rather than struck

Drawing of a slick

A slick is a large chisel, characterized by a wide (2-4 inches, 5–10 cm), heavy blade, and a long, frequently slender, socketed handle. The combined blade and handle can reach two feet (60 cm) in length. The blade of a slick may be slightly curved lengthwise, and/or the handle socket is cranked upward, such that the handle and socket clear the surface of the work when the edge is touching. This distinguishes the slick from the similarly sized, short-handled millwright's chisel.

== Use ==
A slick is always pushed; never struck (thus the slender handle). Using a combination of the tool's weight and bracing the handle against the shoulder or upper arm, fine paring cuts are made. Slicks are typically used by shipwrights and timber framers.

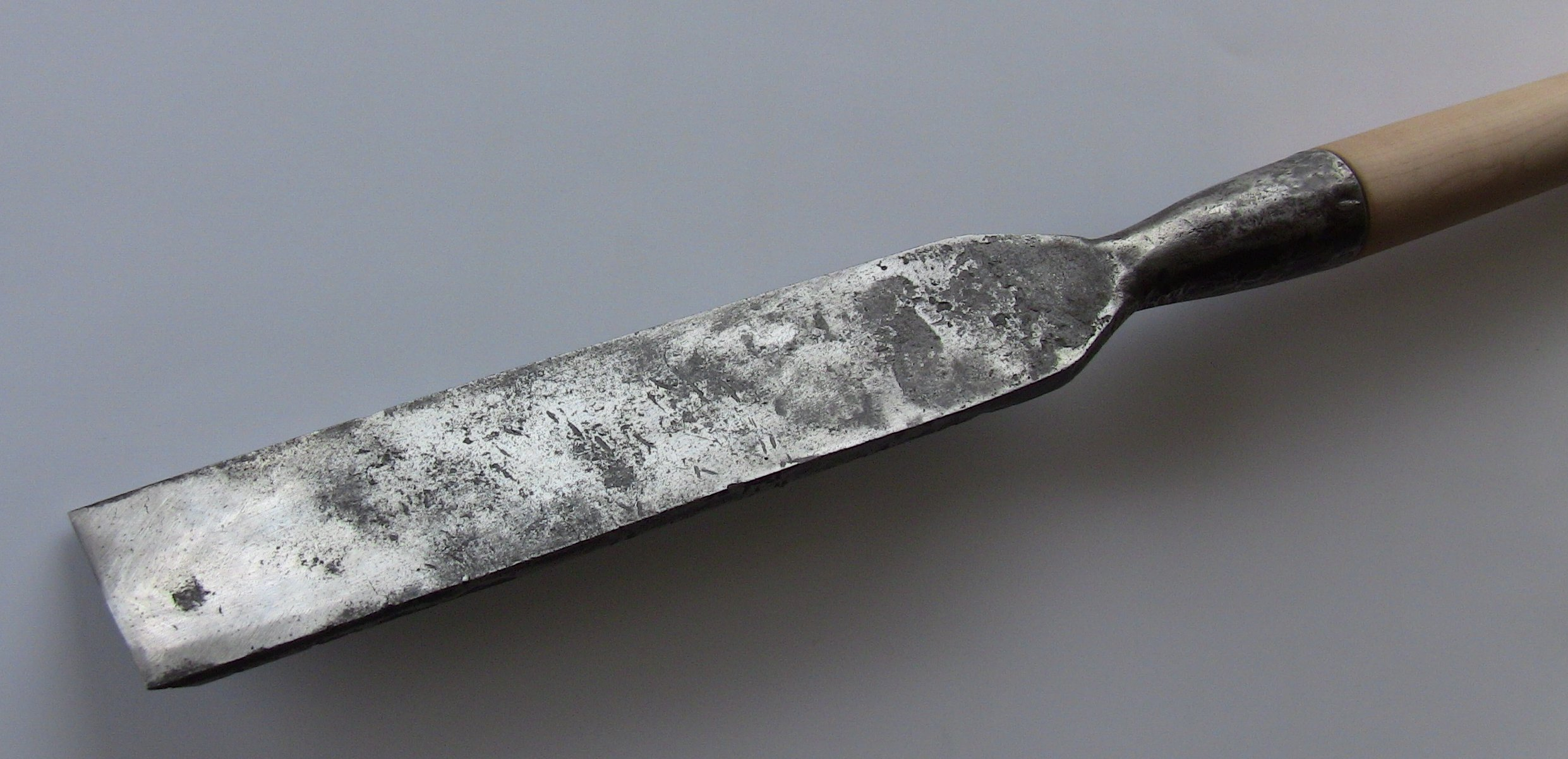
Photo of a slick

== See also ==
- Twybil – Hand tool used for chopping out mortises in green woodworking
