= Creeper (tool) =

Low-profile tool

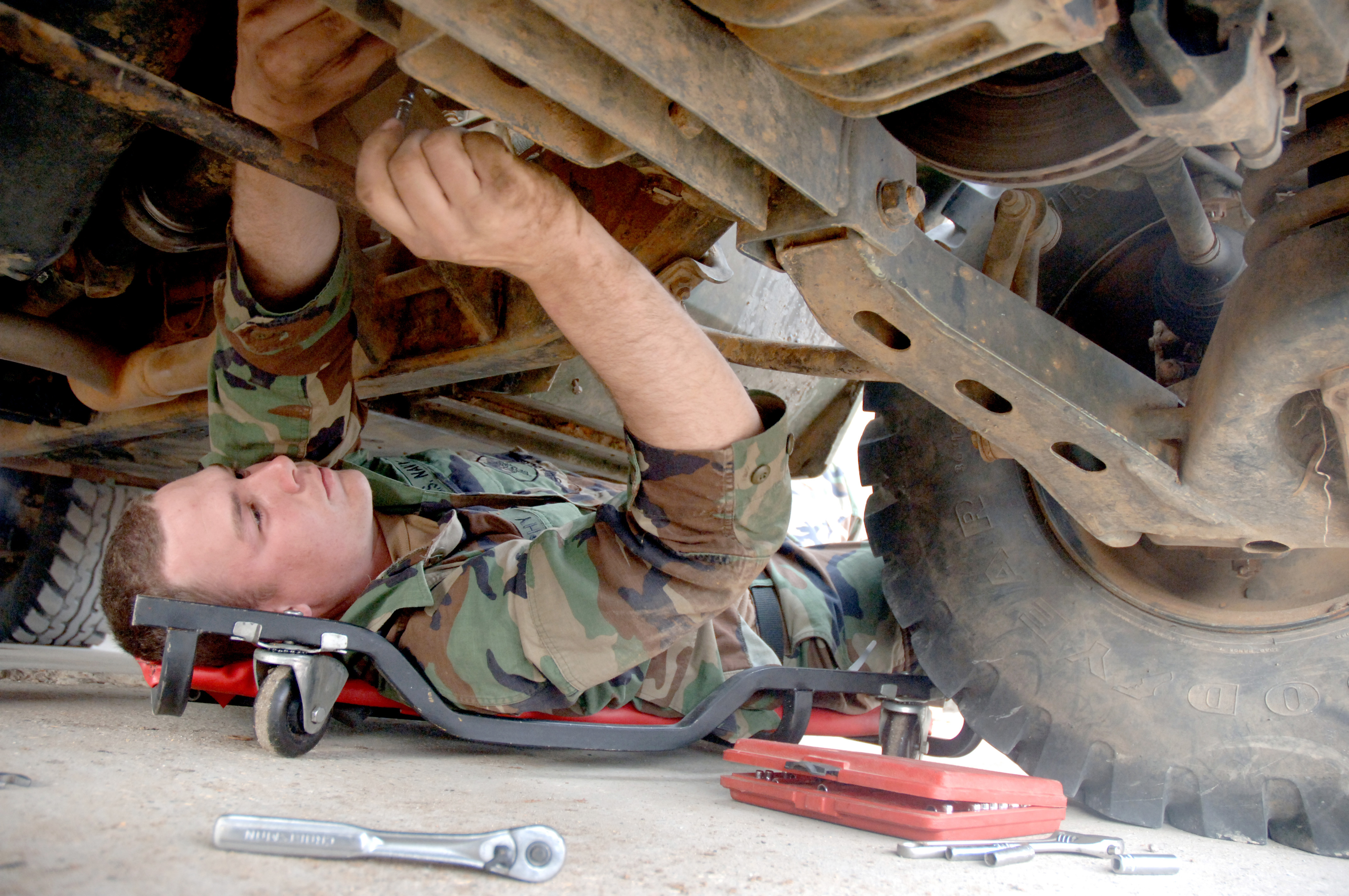
Mechanic lying on a creeper roller.

A creeper is a low-profile tool used to help a person more easily slide in and out of confined spaces, such as the underside of a car, for performing inspection or maintenance. Other names for such devices include car creeper, garage creeper and mechanic creeper. They are built with a low profile to reduce the amount of added height above the ground, thereby providing as much clearance as possible for the person lying on it.

It is usually a wheeled platform constructed using a stiff frame and wheels. Some also have ergonomic shapes or cutouts for the arms and shoulders providing extra room to make it easier to work in the confined space. Other types of creepers include specially designed mats (creeper mats), and there are also various improvised solutions such as lying on cardboard. The alternative to using a creeper is often lying directly on the ground, which gives added clearance, but can make it more difficult to get in and out due to friction against the ground.

Some creepers have dual-uses, such as being able to be folded to make a chair or a stool, or for compact storage. Some also have the ability to recline the headrest somewhat while in the lying position.

Mechanics at work

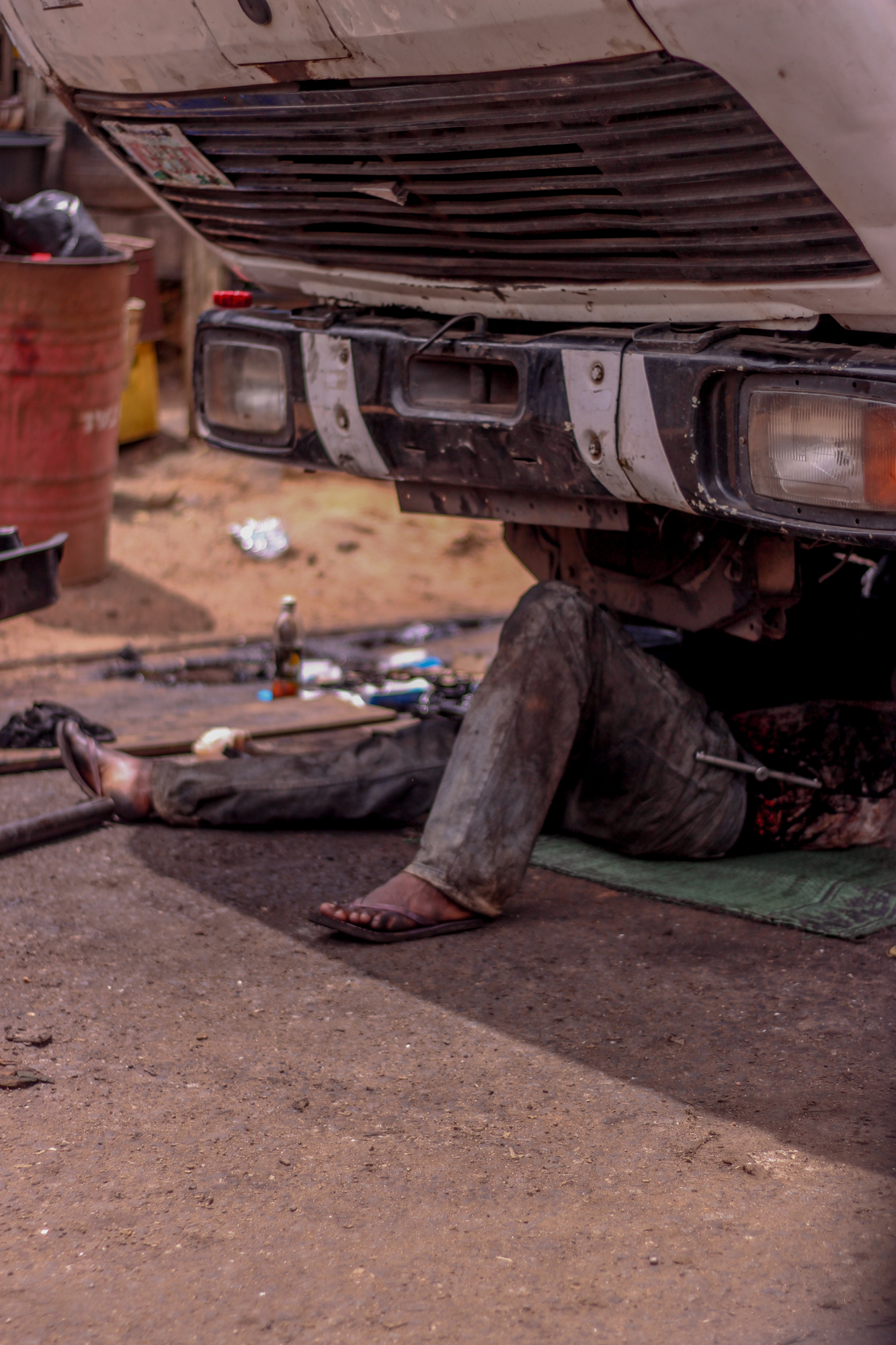
Mechanic lying on a mat.

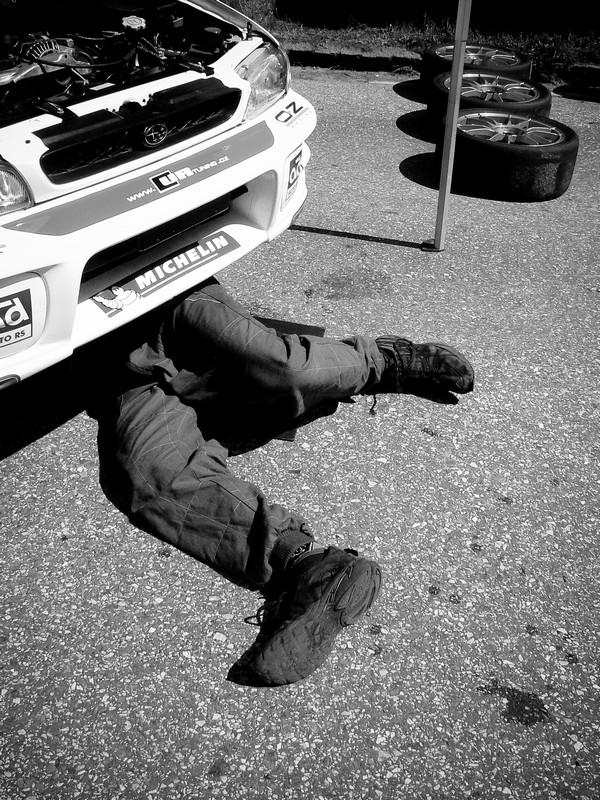
Mechanic lying on the ground.

== See also ==
- Car jack
- Engine crane
- Engine stand
- Ground clearance
