= Low side =

Low side or lowside can refer to:

- A public computer network (e.g. the Internet), in the context of air-gapped computer networks
- Lowsider, a type of motorcycle accident
