= High side =

High Side is an American film.

High side or highside can refer to:

- a classified system
- an air-gapped computer network
- a Highsider, a type of motorcycle accident
