= 2016 Qatar motorcycle Grand Prix =

Motor race

2016 Qatar Grand Prix
Race details
- Race 1 of 18 races in the 2016 Grand Prix motorcycle racing season
- Date: 20 March 2016
- Official name: Commercial Bank Grand Prix of Qatar
- Location: Losail International Circuit
- Course: Permanent racing facility; 5.380 km (3.343 mi)

MotoGP
Pole position
Rider	(Spain) Jorge Lorenzo	Yamaha
Time	1:54.543	
Fastest lap
Rider	(Spain) Jorge Lorenzo	Yamaha
Time	1:54.927 on lap 20	
Podium
First	(Spain) Jorge Lorenzo	Yamaha
Second	(Italy) Andrea Dovizioso	Ducati
Third	(Spain) Marc Márquez	Honda

Moto2
Pole position
Rider	(Germany) Jonas Folger	Kalex
Time	1:59.052	
Fastest lap
Rider	(United Kingdom) Sam Lowes	Kalex
Time	1:59.421 on lap 20	
Podium
First	(Switzerland) Thomas Lüthi	Kalex
Second	(Spain) Luis Salom	Kalex
Third	(Italy) Simone Corsi	Speed Up

Moto3
Pole position
Rider	(Italy) Romano Fenati	KTM
Time	2:06.131	
Fastest lap
Rider	(Belgium) Livio Loi	Honda
Time	2:06.171 on lap 8	
Podium
First	(Italy) Niccolò Antonelli	Honda
Second	(South Africa) Brad Binder	KTM
Third	(Italy) Francesco Bagnaia	Mahindra

The 2016 Qatar motorcycle Grand Prix was the first of eighteen motorcycle races of the 2016 MotoGP season and the thirteenth running of the event. It was held before a crowd of 11,737 spectators at the Losail International Circuit near the Qatari capital city of Doha on 20 March 2016. Yamaha rider Jorge Lorenzo won the 22-lap race after starting from pole position. Andrea Dovizioso came second for Ducati, and Honda's Marc Márquez was third. In the junior classes, Kalex's Thomas Lüthi won the Moto2 race and Niccolò Antonelli on a Honda took the victory in the Moto3 round.

Lorenzo won the pole position by posting the fastest lap in qualifying and held the lead into the first corner. However, he was only able to hold on to first place until the end of the first lap. Andrea Iannone used the superior straight line speed advantage of his Ducati to move into the lead on the main straight. He led for the next five laps until teammate Dovizioso passed him for the lead at the start of lap six. Iannone retook the lead by forcing Dovizioso off the racing line at turn one, but Dovizioso regained the position four turns later. Lorenzo fell to third but returned to second when Iannone crashed lowside at turn thirteen on lap six. Lorenzo then regained the lead from Dovizioso at turn four on lap nine. Over the remaining thirteen laps, he opened up a healthy advantage at the front of the pack to claim his 41st MotoGP victory, and his 62nd in Grand Prix motorcycle racing.

In the junior classes, Jonas Folger started from pole position in Moto2. He held the lead for the first two laps before he crashed and handed the position to Morbidelli. He was then passed by Lüthi. Morbidelli retook first place from Lüthi on the tenth lap and the two battled for the rest of the race. It ended in Lüthi's favour when Morbidelli was penalised twenty seconds for jumping the start. Moto3 had Romano Fenati of KTM begin from pole position and kept first place until teammate Brad Binder duelled him for the lead and Nicolò Bulega joined soon after. The race was decided by a last lap overtaking manoeuvre by Antonelli. He slipstreamed Binder on the main straight and pulled out of it to win by a photo finish with a gap of seven-thousands of a second.

The result of the first race of the season meant Lorenzo led the Riders' Championship with twenty-five points. Dovizioso was second on twenty points and Márquez placed third with sixteen points. Valentino Rossi on the other Yamaha and Dani Pedrosa on the second factory Honda completed the top five. In the Teams' Championship, Yamaha MotoGP lead with 38 points, followed by Honda with twenty-seven points and Ducati with twenty points. Tech 3 and Suzuki were fourth and fifth. Yamaha became the early leaders of the Constructors' Championship with twenty-five points; Ducati and Honda followed in second and third positions with twenty and sixteen points respectively with seventeen rounds left in the season.

== MotoGP ==
=== Background ===
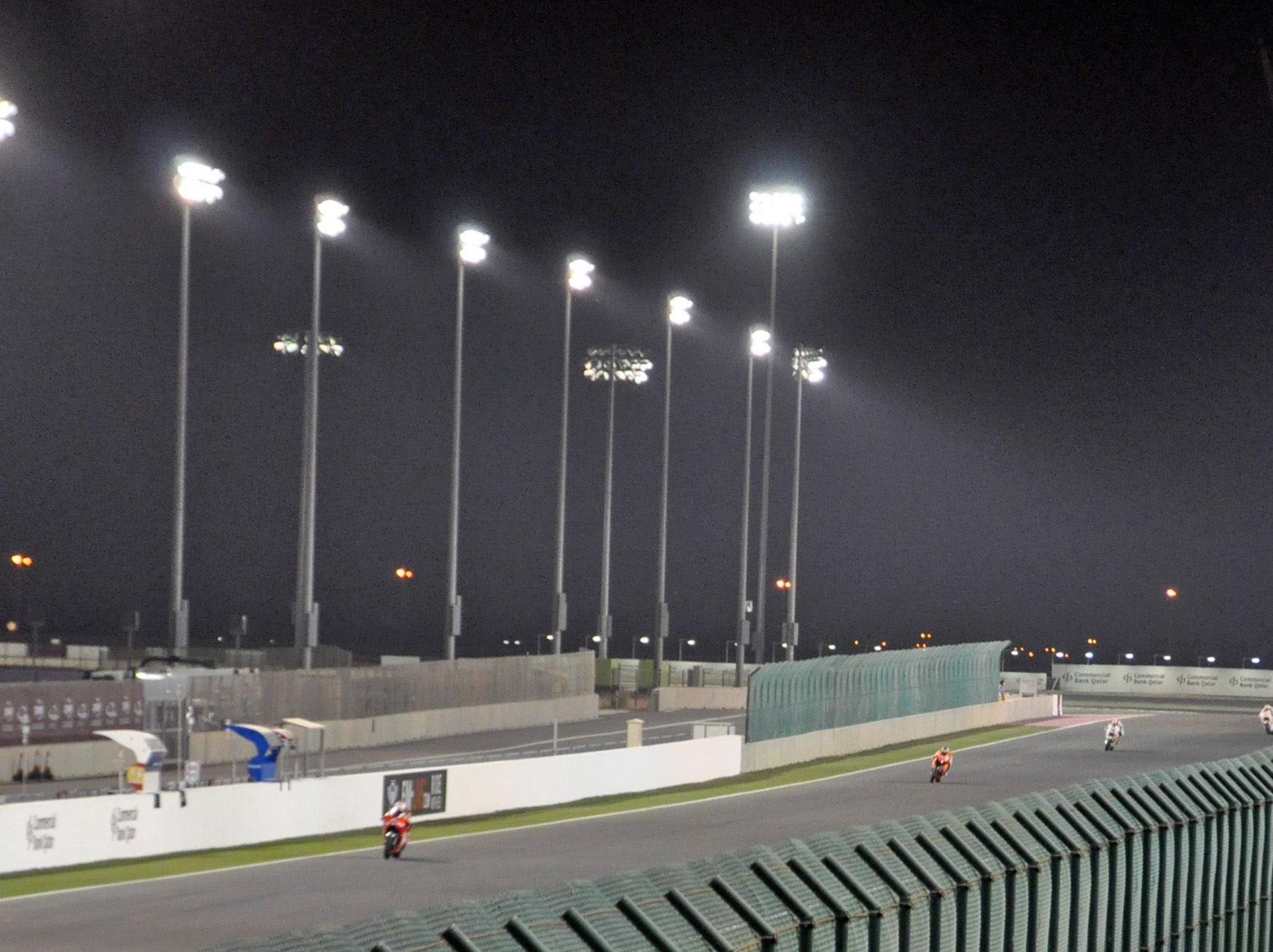
The Losail International Circuit (pictured in 2010), where the race was held.

The world governing body of motorcycle racing, the Fédération Internationale de Motocyclisme (FIM) and the sport's commercial rights holder Dorna Sports confirmed the 2016 Qatar Grand Prix as part of MotoGP's 2016 schedule in February 2016. It was the thirteenth time the race was held and it was the season's sole night round. Qatar was the first of eighteen rounds scheduled by FIM. It took place at the sixteen-turn 5.380 km (3.343 mi) Losail International Circuit near Doha on 20 March 2016. The track was described as "a serious test of both rider and machine" due to its mixture of fast and slow corners. It is surrounded by the desert where dust and sand often cover the track. This affects tyre grip and how slippery the circuit becomes when riders go off the racing line. This race also saw Michelin take over from Bridgestone as MotoGP's official tyre supplier, returning for the first time since the 2008 Valencian Grand Prix. All bikes featured unified electronic packages in an attempt to reduce costs, close the deficit between the factory and satellite teams and bring a new focus on rider control.

Heading into the new season, some teams opted to keep the same line-up as the previous season; however, some teams changed riders. One of the main changes involved the début appearance of 2014 Moto2 World Champion Tito Rabat on one of the two Marc VDS Racing bikes. Rabat took the place of Scott Redding who switched to Pramac Racing. 2014 Moto3 runner-up Jack Miller took his place at Marc VDS Racing as they expanded and ran a second motorbike for 2016. Yonny Hernández did not have his contract with Pramac Racing renewed. He moved to Aspar Team to replace 2006 World Champion Nicky Hayden, who left MotoGP for the Superbike World Championship. AB Motoracing and Karel Abraham left MotoGP after five seasons and switched to the Superbike World Championship as did Alex de Angelis and Ioda Racing. Loris Baz moved to Avintia Racing to replace Mike Di Meglio who went to the FIM Endurance World Championship. The final change was Stefan Bradl who remained with Aprilia after riding for them as a replacement rider in 2015 when Marco Melandri left MotoGP during the middle of the season. Title holder Jorge Lorenzo stayed with Yamaha MotoGP after his title-winning campaign and was again joined by seven-time MotoGP champion Valentino Rossi.

The press considered Lorenzo the favourite to retain his championship because of his pace in pre-season testing. They considered his teammate Rossi and Honda's Marc Márquez, who won the title in 2013 and 2014, to be his main rivals over the course of the season. Lorenzo said he felt strong and competitive. He spoke of his satisfaction of adapting well to the Michelin tyres and knew a good position in Qatar would demonstrate his quick race pace, "I would like to start this 2016 season in the best way possible, especially compared to the beginning of 2015. Let‘s go into this race fighting and enjoy it!" Márquez was down on pace in pre-season testing because Honda was struggling to adapt to the new electronics package for the RC213V's aggressive engine package. He aimed to win the championship and said he would use what he learned from his rivalry with Rossi the previous year, "This year will be an interesting season because everything looks closer and compared to the past there is more balance. We will try to fight for the championship and use the experience from last year from the beginning of the season to the end and fight again for the title until Valencia. The Qatar circuit doesn’t suit me and my Honda, but we can play around our technical difficulties with motivation."

=== Practice and qualifying ===
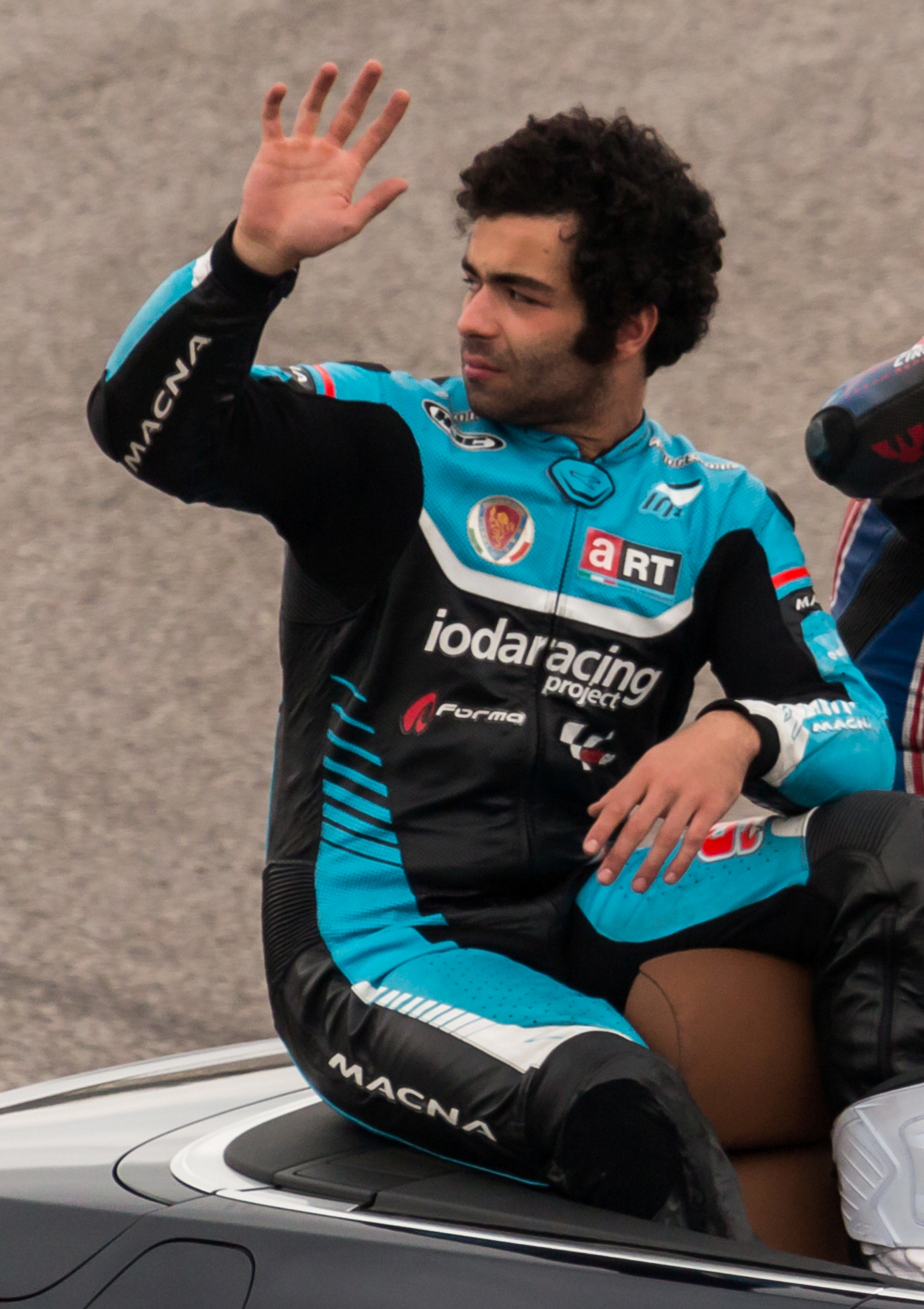
Danilo Petrucci (pictured in 2014) withdrew when an x-ray showed he re-opened fractures sealed by surgery in his right hand.

Four practice sessions were held before the Sunday race. The first session on Thursday evening lasted 45 minutes and the two following identically timed sessions took place on Friday evening. The fourth session on Saturday evening ran for half an hour. Lorenzo set the fastest lap of the first practice at one minute and 55.440 seconds early on, followed by teammate Rossi, Andrea Iannone, Héctor Barberá, Maverick Viñales, Pol Espargaró, Pedrosa, Márquez, Andrea Dovizioso and Redding. Bradley Smith was the only rider to crash in the session when he lost control of the front of his bike and fell at turn thirteen with two minutes left. Early in the second practice session, Iannone set the quickest time of one minute and 55.388 seconds. Márquez improved for second and Redding placed third in the session's closing minutes. Viñales, Dovizioso, Pedrosa, Rossi, Barberá, Lorenzo and Danilo Petrucci filled positions four to ten. Cal Crutchlow crashed at turn fifteen after losing control of his bike's front. Loris Baz went down heavily at turn thirteen soon after. Iannone continued to run fast and set the fastest lap of the day in the third practice session at one minute and 54.639 seconds. Lorenzo, Márquez. Dovizioso, Viñales, Pedrosa, Rossi, Barberá, Redding and Pol Espargaró followed in the top ten. Smith crashed for a second time entering turn six and Miller lost control of his bike at turn nine later on.

Petrucci fractured three metacarpal bones in his right hand in a pre-season testing accident at Phillip Island Grand Prix Circuit. He opted not to wear a protective cast because he had little arm feeling after completing two laps of the Qatar track. Petrucci was in pain after the third practice and underwent an x-ray which revealed a dislocated bone segment in his third metacarpal due to some fractures sealed by surgery re-opening under the stress of riding. He withdrew from the race, and his team did not employ a replacement rider. Before Saturday's action started, a moment of silence was held for Tunisian motorcyclist Taoufik Gattouchi who died from injuries he sustained in a multi-bike accident in the Losail 600 Cup support race. Lorenzo topped the final practice with a one minute and 55.301 seconds lap. Márquez, Dovizioso, Rossi, Iannone, Crutchlow, Pol Espargaró, Viñales, Redding and Smith completed the top ten ahead of qualifying. Miller crashed leaving turn fifteen early on but remounted and continued. Baz then fell off his bike at turn seven but was not injured. The third rider to fall was Redding when he crashed at turn sixteen but was unhurt and returned to the pit lane. Bradl lost control of his bike's front and crashed at turn two. Trackside marshals recovered him unhurt.

At the end of fourth practice, Rossi created tension within Yamaha. He was on a fast lap, and his teammate Lorenzo was on the inside line which led to Rossi slowing. Television cameras showed him remonstrating with Lorenzo after the latter left the pit lane before they continued round the circuit. They stopped on the start/finish straight and the conservation continued at their practice starts. Rossi alleged Lorenzo did not notice him and likened the situation to the penalty point he received on his race licence after qualifying for the 2015 San Marino and Rimini's Coast Grand Prix when he was deemed to have impeded him. Lorenzo claimed he was trying his best not to impede Rossi and argued he could not go anywhere else but the gravel trap.

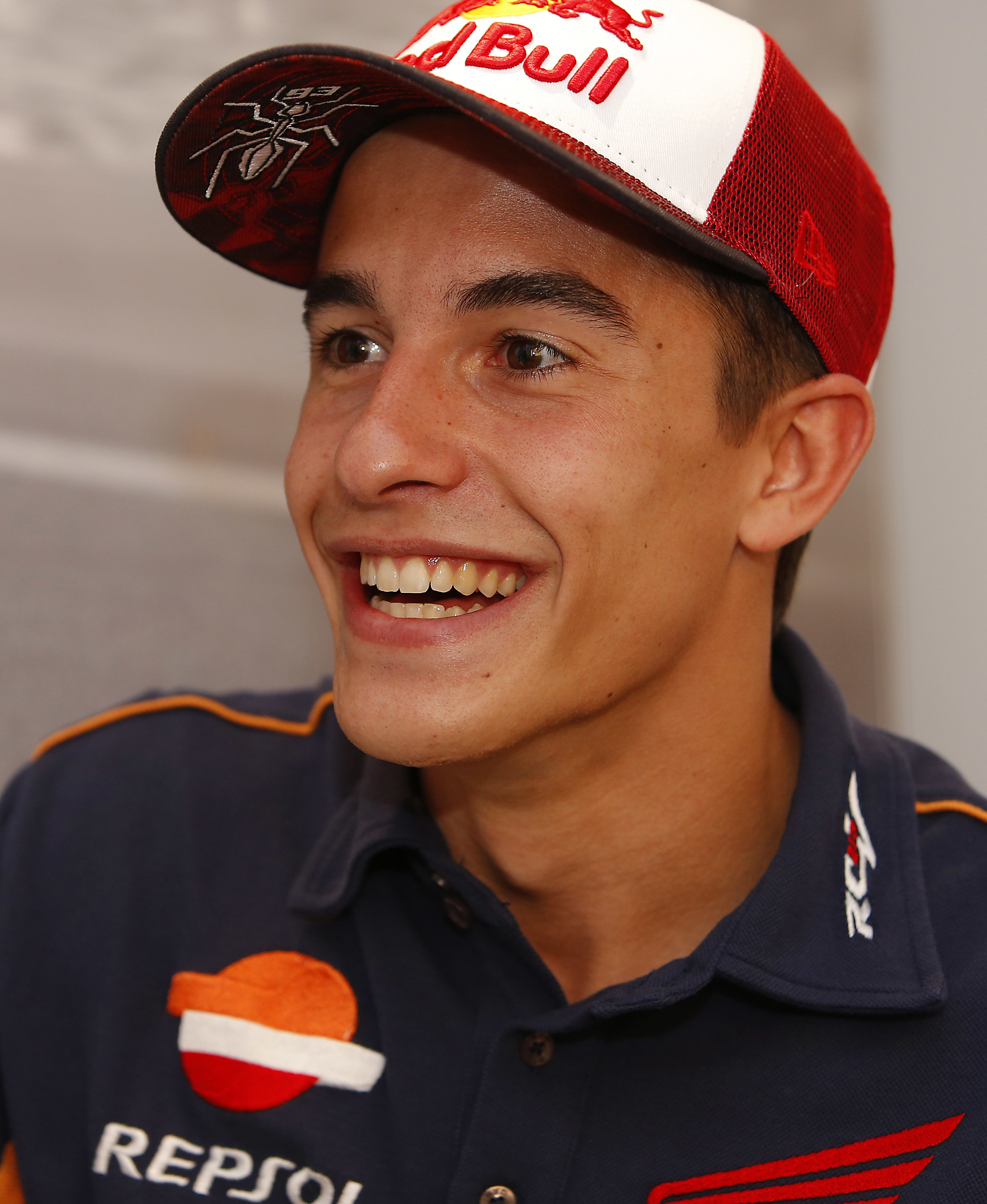
Marc Márquez qualified second after losing pole position due to him setting his fastest lap time after qualifying ended.

Saturday evening's qualifying session was divided into two parts. The two sessions lasted fifteen minutes each. The slowest riders in the first three practice sessions competed in the first part. The second part included the combined top ten quickest participants from the opening trio of practice sessions. The first session had the fastest two riders progress into the second which determined pole position to twelfth. Riders had to qualify within 107% of the pole position lap time to ensure their qualification for the race. All riders ran twice with most entering the pit lane with five minutes left in the crash-free second qualifying session and pushed immediately due to optimum track conditions. On his first run in clear air, Lorenzo claimed a record-breaking, 62nd career pole position and his 36th in MotoGP with a time of one minute and 54.543 seconds but could not improve due to a rider error. Márquez took second and could not claim pole because he miscalculated his best lap time which he began just after qualifying ended. Márquez executed a wheelie because his front tyre locked due to a possible brake malfunction and veered left into the gravel trap during a practice start. Viñales made it an all-Spanish front row on his final lap and took his second first row start since the 2015 Catalan Grand Prix Iannone was fourth after losing two-tenths of a second when Redding delayed him in the closing complex of corners on his final timed lap. Rossi took fifth having moved up the grid during qualifying.

Dovizioso did five laps and aimed to start from the grid's first two rows. He achieved this with sixth place. Pedrosa took seventh having been unable to improve his position due to a problem with his second set of tyres and was ahead of Barberá's leading satellite bike. Pol Espargaró was ninth after waiting to find space on the track on his last run. Crutchlow progressed to the second session as its fastest driver and was tenth in front of Smith (who had little confidence with bike control in the corners) and Redding. Hernández was the fastest driver not to advance to the second qualifying session; his best lap time of one minute and 56.157 seconds was 1.6 seconds slower than Lorenzo due to tyre problems. 14th-placed Eugene Laverty shifted to sixth gear but it failed to engage before the start/finish line cost him around three-tenths of a second. Aleix Espargaró slid off the circuit and into turn one. He returned to the pit lane to get on his second bike with four minutes left in first qualifying but could not control its front and qualified 15th. Issues with Baz's bike led to his team modifying it. This did not improve it and he took 16th ahead of Álvaro Bautista who used worn tyres and later crashed. Miller recorded one qualifying lap and was 18th. Miller was ahead of teammate Rabat and Bradl.

=== Warm-up ===
The riders took to the track on Sunday afternoon for a twenty-minute warm-up session. Márquez continued his strong form and set the fastest lap at one minute and 54.400 seconds, 0.227 seconds faster than fellow Spaniard Viñales in second. Lorenzo was a further 0.068 seconds behind in third place. Rossi, Dovizioso, Iannone, Crutchlow, Redding, Pol Espargaró and Smith made up the rest of the top ten fastest riders. Hernández was unhurt in a crash at turn sixteen with five minutes remaining. During warm-up, Iannone reached the highest-ever recorded speed in an official MotoGP session at the time, at 351.2 km/h (218.2 mph), exceeding the previous record of 350.8 km/h (218.0 mph) that he achieved at the 2015 San Marino and Rimini's Coast Grand Prix.

=== Race ===
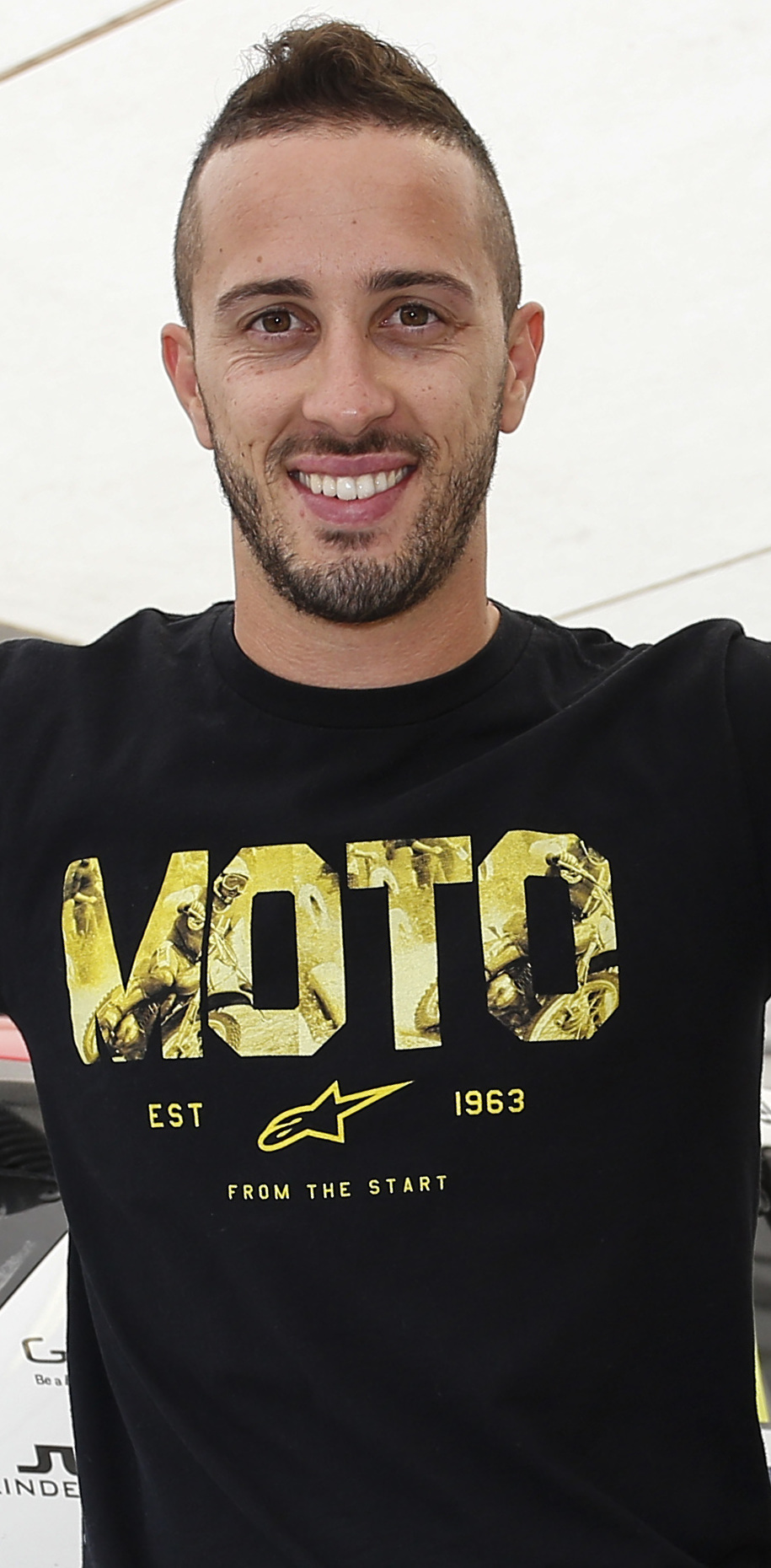
Andrea Dovizioso led the race after passing Ducati teammate Andrea Iannone on the sixth lap and eventually came second.

Weather conditions at the start were dry and warm. The air temperature was 21 °C (70 °F) and the asphalt temperature was 23 °C (73 °F). The race began from its standing start before a crowd of 11,737 spectators at 21:00 Arabia Standard Time (UTC+03:00). Lorenzo executed a brisk start to maintain his pole position advantage going into the first corner. Márquez and Viñales made slow getaways and fell to fifth and seventh respectively. Ducati teammates Iannone and Dovizioso made fast starts to run in second and third leaving the first sequence of corners. Iannone drew close to Lorenzo through the turn twelve to fourteen turns complex as he was setting up an overtake on him on the start/finish straight. Iannone used his Ducati's superior straight line speed advantage of around 10 km/h (6.2 mph) on the straight to pass Lorenzo for the lead just as the field began the second lap. Dovizioso followed on the other Ducati soon after. The top five began pulling away from the rest of the field as they distanced Pedrosa and Viñales. Hernández was the race's first retiree with a broken engine sensor on lap two.

Such was Ducati's speed difference over the other bikes they were able to get away from the rest of the field. This prevented Iaonnone from being overtaken on the start/finish straight, but Lorenzo was able to get close under braking for the first corner. On the third lap, Márquez out-braked Rossi to force his way into fourth place at turn six without contact. After that, Márquez set the fastest lap of the race at that point of one minute and 55.710 seconds on lap four as he sought to close up to Lorenzo. Crutchlow moved into eighth and was pushing hard to gain on seventh-placed Viñales. Further down the order, Smith fell to ninth after Barberá got ahead of him and Baz overtook Laverty for fifteenth on the lap. Márquez ran wide on the fifth lap and stopped Rossi from retaking fourth. On lap six, Dovizioso passed teammate Iannone around the outside for the lead at turn one. However, Iannone pushed him off the racing line and retook the position by switching back on the apex of the corner; Dovizioso eased off the throttle. Dovizioso finally overtook Iannone at the fifth corner. The top five closed up with Lorenzo making an attempt at getting by Iannone.

But, as Iannone was starting to get back at teammate Dovizioso for the lead, he ran onto the dirty white line at turn thirteen and lost control of the front of his bike. Iannone fell lowside at high speed and although he retired immediately he was unhurt. The crash promoted Lorenzo, Márquez and Rossi into second to fourth, with Pedrosa 1.3 seconds behind the trio which then grew to two seconds. Meanwhile, Crutchlow was closing on Pedrosa when his bike had a software system fault that confused where it was on the circuit and gave him power when it should have been reduced. This caused Crutchlow to crash on lap seven at turn four by going 60 km/h (37 mph) faster than normal because of no engine braking. On the eighth lap, Pol Espargaro passed Smith, demoting him to ninth. Lorenzo exited the final turn close behind Dovizioso at the end of the lap but was not near enough to overtake him at the first corner. At turn four on lap nine, Lorenzo overtook Dovizioso around the outside for first place. That lap, Baz lacked front grip entering corners and traction leaving them. He attempted to change lines to extract the most from his bike, but entering turn two, he lost control of its front and crashed.

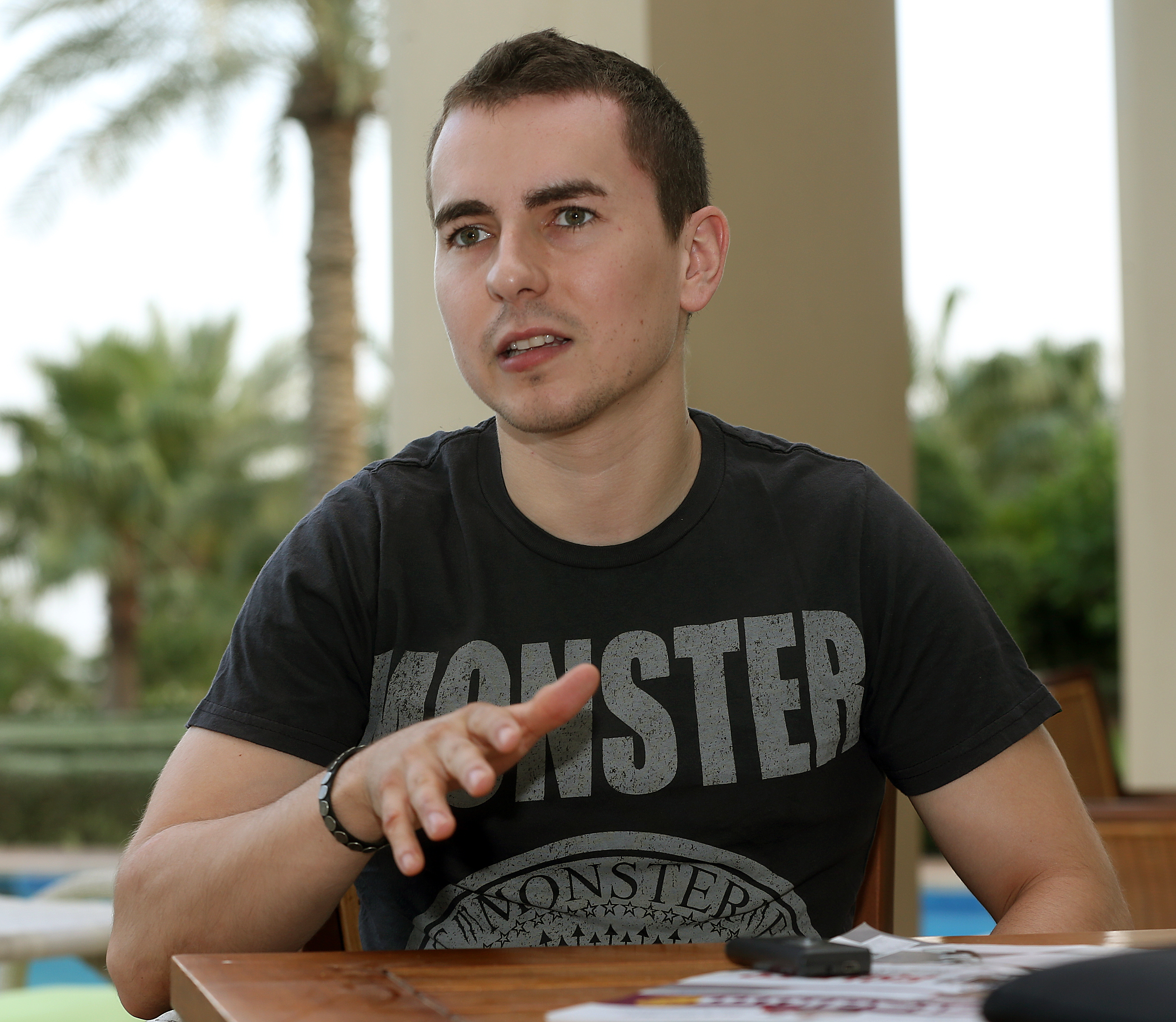
Jorge Lorenzo (pictured in 2013) took his 41st victory in MotoGP and his 62nd in Grand Prix motorcycle racing.

Márquez closed up to Dovizioso with Rossi behind while Lorenzo held a 0.164 second lead at the start of lap ten. This allowed him to stay unchallenged into turn one and he extended his advantage over the next two laps. Barberá was overtaken by Pol Espargaró for seventh place and Laverty passed Miller for twelfth on lap twelve. Bradl lost all tyre grip in turn fifteen and crashed sideways on the thirteenth lap. Márquez reduced Dovizioso's hold on second entering turn ten and fifteen. Dovizioso distanced him on the main straight, however, because the Honda lacked the straight line speed to stay with the Ducati. As fuel burned off, lap times improved and Lorenzo bettered Casey Stoner's 2008 lap record of the Losail International Circuit with a time of one minute and 55.109 seconds to further his lead on lap 16. Smith passed Barberá in the track's third sector on the following lap. Just as Rossi set his best lap time after being instructed via pitboard to change his engine brake settings on lap 17, he ran deep at turn six a lap later, losing him half a second to the top three. Márquez attacked Dovizioso for the next six laps and overtook him for second on the inside line at turn ten on lap nineteen.

Márquez gained an advantage over Dovizioso by narrowly retaining second on the main straight despite the latter drawing level entering turn one. Lorenzo was 1.159 seconds ahead of Márquez at the start of lap 20. He extended his advantage to 1.841 seconds by responding to Márquez's pace with the race's fastest second and third sectors to set a new track record of one minute and 54.927 seconds. Dovizioso remained close behind Márquez, but Rossi had now joined the second place battle. Dovizioso passed Márquez to retake second on the main straight. Márquez tried to regain second at turn six but was not close enough to affect a pass. He had one last attempt around the outside of Dovizioso at the final turn. Márquez retook second but ran slightly wide allowing Dovizioso to keep second on the main straight. Lorenzo finished the race first to claim his 41st MotoGP victory and his 62nd in Grand Prix motorcycle racing. Dovizioso, Márquez and Rossi were separated by three-tenths of a second in second and fourth places. Pedrosa, Viñales, Pol Espargaró, Smith, Barberá, Redding, Aleix Espargaró, Laverty, Bautista, Miller and Rabat were the final classified finishers.

=== Post-race ===
The top-three riders appeared on the podium to collect their trophies and spoke to the media in the subsequent press conference. Lorenzo described his victory as "one of the best of my whole career". He stated his belief a decision made by Yamaha to run the rear soft compound tyre helped him, "The harder compound should become better and better, but I think what happened was the opposite. The softer tyre should get worse and worse, but it was faster and faster so this little difference was the difference between me and Dovizioso and Marquez." Dovizioso spoke of his happiness at finishing second and thanked his team for providing him with a fast bike. He also said his bike's engine allowed him to fend off Márquez in the final laps of the Grand Prix, "It’s always hard to fight with Marquez at the end of the race but my engine really helped me. We did some good testing in the winter and this result continues that work." Third-placed Márquez said he was pleased with his result on a track where Honda traditionally struggled. He highlighted his problem on getting close to Dovizioso and not being able to overtake him for much of the race, "The race was faster than we expected and we had a great weekend, because we got 100% out of our performance at a circuit that we find hard."

In parc fermé and on the podium, the crowd booed Lorenzo and Márquez. A series of incidents between Rossi and Márquez in 2015 was the catalyst of their displeasure. This prompted Lorenzo to do the zip gesture to the crowd while riding his bike and on the podium. Several riders called on Rossi to ensure his supporters were respectful to others, but he declined to take responsibility for their actions, "I don’t think that in Qatar there were so many Italian fans. However, I did not create this situation, and I don’t see how I could fix it." While he disliked booing, Márquez added it was something to be expected in the upcoming races, "We must adapt and for me it doesn’t matter the colours of the fans, I think as long as everybody enjoyed the race, that’s what is most important for me." Rossi's supporters have frequently booed Lorenzo since he entered MotoGP in 2008. He admitted his confusion over why he received abuse from his teammate's fans, "I don’t think we did anything wrong in the last months [of 2015]. We just concentrated on going very fast. I won the championship, and Marc did the best job he could in 2015. We’re just trying to be the best on track and we’re risking our lives in the process."

Iannone explained that he reviewed the data after his lap six crash and said he was puzzled about how it caused him to retire, "Usually the white line has grip, but this time it's very, very slippery. This is the racing life, but for sure I am a little bit disappointed about this experience. For me, it's really difficult to accept this. I am sure it was possible to fight with Jorge, and with me, the race for sure the race is completely different." Rossi did not feel he could have bettered his fourth place result because of his bike's speed. He said he could not have pushed harder earlier in the Grand Prix, "I was strong but not enough to try one attack, to have one sector, one braking, one part where I was a little bit faster than the guys in front of me. I was always there, but always 10 meters [away] – trying like this, trying to stay behind, but unfortunately I don't have enough speed for attack. This was the problem." Crutchlow said he was angry because he felt his bike had good pace and explained it grew increasingly out of sync as the race progressed because of his engine braking glitch that had reoccurred from practice. He emphasised that Honda were blameless, "'I'm disappointed because I know I had a great pace, I had better pace than some guys that I thought I wouldn't have. For me it was an easy fifth place, and a crash that I didn't need, and that wasn't my fault."

Because this was the first race of the season, Lorenzo took the lead of the Riders' Championship with twenty-five points. Dovizioso was second with twenty points and Márquez placed third with sixteen points. Rossi stood in fourth with thirteen points and Pedrosa rounded out the top five with eleven points. In the Teams' Championship, Yamaha MotoGP held the lead with 38 points, followed by Repsol Honda with twenty-seven points and Ducati Corse with twenty points. Tech 3 (seventeen points) and Suzuki MotoGP (fifteen points) were fourth and fifth. Yamaha became the early leaders of the Constructors' Championship with twenty-five points; Ducati and Honda followed in second and third positions with twenty and sixteen points respectively. Suzuki and Aprilia placed fourth and fifth with a respective ten and three points with seventeen rounds left in the season.

== Moto2 ==
After topping the second practice session for the Moto2 race, Jonas Folger took the first pole position of 2016 with a class lap record time at the Losail International Circuit of one minute and 59.052 seconds eight minutes in. Sam Lowes was consistent during practice and carried over the form to clinch second. Álex Rins was third after emerging unhurt from a crash at turn two early in qualifying. Doctors forbade Lorenzo Baldassarri from racing because he dislocated both his shoulders in a qualifying accident at turn two. Folger was the pre-race favourite and made a good start to retain the lead into turn one. He held a one second advantage by the end of the first lap over Takaaki Nakagami and Lowes. Johann Zarco, Marcel Schrötter, Lowes and Rins were handed ride-through penalties because they were judged to have jumped the start and served them on the next lap. Folger was pushing upfront but found he went beyond the limits of his bike and retired from a crash at the turn four gravel trap on lap three. This gave Franco Morbidelli the lead, but he lost it soon after to Thomas Lüthi. Nakagami and Robin Mulhauser were also given ride-through penalties for jumping the start. The battle between Morbidelli and Lüthi continued with the former going to the inside of the latter when the opportunity arose. Simone Corsi moved to third when Nakagami served his ride-through penalty.

Morbidelli retook the lead from Lüthi on the tenth lap and tried to open up an advantage over him. Lüthi glimpsed space midway through the penultimate lap and began drawing closer to Morbidelli who narrowly held on for the rest of the race to win on the road. However, on the final lap, it was announced Morbidelli would be issued a twenty-second time penalty because he was deemed to have jumped the start. Sandro Cortese was penalised for the same infraction. Hence, Lüthi claimed his first victory of the season by 9.610 seconds and took the lead of the Riders' Championship. He was ahead of Luis Salom in second. Corsi completed the podium in third. After the event, race director Mike Webb explained a camera that observes jump starts did not show the correct images because of a recording and playback fault. After watching television footage prior to the start of the race, he denied suggestions of light flickering by some riders. Webb said he would speak to the Grand Prix Commission about reviewing the regulation on how penalties are applied within the opening four laps of the race to riders who are deemed to have jumped the start.

== Moto3 ==
In qualifying for the Moto3 race, riders slipstreamed one another on the main straight. KTM's Romano Fenati clinched his second class pole position with a time of two minutes and 6.131 seconds in the closing seconds of the session. He was 0.047 seconds faster than the pacesetter of the weekend Livio Loi in second. Brad Binder was another 0.067 seconds behind in third place. However, he was demoted three places on the grid for exceeding the 110% limit of his quickest sector times in the third practice session. Fenati held his lead at the start of the race with Loi and Binder close behind. On the second lap, Loi attempted to pass Fenati for first position but fell out of the top five by going wide at turn one. The impact of the Qatari slipstream was so great it meant the first twenty riders were in close formation. Positions constantly changed as the first five eventually began opening up an advantage by the fifth lap. The main straight had positions change with the riders leading out of the final turn finding themselves losing one place. Nicoló Bulega used his aggressive riding style to close on the lead group and be in their slipstream by lap seven. On lap nine, Binder took advantage of heavy fighting for the lead to claim the position, but Fenati caught him on the main straight and the duel continued.

Bulega was able to take first place from Binder on the fifteenth lap. Binder responded by reclaiming the lead soon after. Fenati executed several manoeuvres to get back into second place as the gap was being lowered by Enea Bastianini further down the pack. A photo finish decided the lead battle on the final lap. Binder was holding first place as Fenati out-braked himself and went wide at the first turn which dropped him from second to sixth. Niccolò Antonelli, nursing a collarbone injury he sustained during pre-season testing that was worsened in practice, was at the rear of the group. He waited for his opportunity to attack in the final corners of the track. Antonelli knew he could use the slipstream on the main straight and did so to get alongside Binder. Antonelli then moved out of the slipstream and successfully out-dragged Binder to clinch his third career Moto3 victory by seven-thousands of a second and became the early leader of the Riders' Championship. Francesco Bagnaia was the best-placed Mahindra rider in third and took the marque's first podium finish since 2014. Fenati recovered to fourth, Bastianini took fifth, Bulega was sixth after a last-lap attempt at getting into the top three came to nothing. Jorge Navarro placed seventh and Loi was eighth.

== Classification ==
=== MotoGP ===
Pos.	No.	Rider	Team	Manufacturer	Laps	Time/Retired	Grid	Points
1	99	(Spain) Jorge Lorenzo	Movistar Yamaha MotoGP	Yamaha	22	42:28.452	1	25
2	4	(Italy) Andrea Dovizioso	Ducati Team	Ducati	22	+2.019	6	20
3	93	(Spain) Marc Márquez	Repsol Honda Team	Honda	22	+2.287	2	16
4	46	(Italy) Valentino Rossi	Movistar Yamaha MotoGP	Yamaha	22	+2.387	5	13
5	26	(Spain) Dani Pedrosa	Repsol Honda Team	Honda	22	+14.083	7	11
6	25	(Spain) Maverick Viñales	Team Suzuki Ecstar	Suzuki	22	+15.423	3	10
7	44	(Spain) Pol Espargaró	Monster Yamaha Tech 3	Yamaha	22	+18.629	9	9
8	38	(United Kingdom) Bradley Smith	Monster Yamaha Tech 3	Yamaha	22	+18.652	11	8
9	8	(Spain) Héctor Barberá	Avintia Racing	Ducati	22	+21.160	8	7
10	45	(United Kingdom) Scott Redding	Octo Pramac Yakhnich	Ducati	22	+24.435	12	6
11	41	(Spain) Aleix Espargaró	Team Suzuki Ecstar	Suzuki	22	+35.847	15	5
12	50	(Republic of Ireland) Eugene Laverty	Aspar Team MotoGP	Ducati	22	+41.756	14	4
13	19	(Spain) Álvaro Bautista	Aprilia Racing Team Gresini	Aprilia	22	+41.932	17	3
14	43	(Australia) Jack Miller	Estrella Galicia 0,0 Marc VDS	Honda	22	+41.982	18	2
15	53	(Spain) Tito Rabat	Estrella Galicia 0,0 Marc VDS	Honda	22	+54.953	19	1
Ret	6	(Germany) Stefan Bradl	Aprilia Racing Team Gresini	Aprilia	11	Accident	20	
Ret	76	(France) Loris Baz	Avintia Racing	Ducati	8	Accident	16	
Ret	35	(United Kingdom) Cal Crutchlow	LCR Honda	Honda	6	Accident	10	
Ret	29	(Italy) Andrea Iannone	Ducati Team	Ducati	5	Accident	4	
Ret	68	(Colombia) Yonny Hernández	Aspar Team MotoGP	Ducati	1	Engine Sensor	13	
DNS	9	(Italy) Danilo Petrucci	Octo Pramac Yakhnich	Ducati		Did not start		

=== Moto2 ===
Pos.	No.	Rider	Manufacturer	Laps	Time/Retired	Grid	Points
1	12	(Switzerland) Thomas Lüthi	Kalex	20	40:14.293	9	25
2	39	(Spain) Luis Salom	Kalex	20	+9.610	17	20
3	24	(Italy) Simone Corsi	Speed Up	20	+9.665	13	16
4	55	(Malaysia) Hafizh Syahrin	Kalex	20	+13.558	15	13
5	77	(Switzerland) Dominique Aegerter	Kalex	20	+16.064	14	11
6	52	(United Kingdom) Danny Kent	Kalex	20	+16.114	10	10
7	21	(Italy) Franco Morbidelli	Kalex	20	+20.047 (Note: Twenty-second time penalty for a jump start.)	5	9
8	40	(Spain) Álex Rins	Kalex	20	+20.170	3	8
9	22	(United Kingdom) Sam Lowes	Kalex	20	+22.019	2	7
10	10	(Italy) Luca Marini	Kalex	20	+24.249	25	6
11	44	(Portugal) Miguel Oliveira	Kalex	20	+24.254	21	5
12	5	(France) Johann Zarco	Kalex	20	+24.570	4	4
13	14	(Thailand) Ratthapark Wilairot	Kalex	20	+25.664	22	3
14	30	(Japan) Takaaki Nakagami	Kalex	20	+26.992	8	2
15	11	(Germany) Sandro Cortese	Kalex	20	+29.736	6	1
16	54	(Italy) Mattia Pasini	Kalex	20	+30.404	18	
17	23	(Germany) Marcel Schrötter	Kalex	20	+38.446	7	
18	2	(Switzerland) Jesko Raffin	Kalex	20	+46.363	24	
19	32	(Spain) Isaac Viñales	Tech 3	20	+46.543	26	
20	70	(Switzerland) Robin Mulhauser	Kalex	20	+1:18.323	27	
21	33	(Italy) Alessandro Tonucci	Kalex	20	+1:25.002	28	
22	8	(Spain) Efrén Vázquez	Suter	20	+1:39.572	29	
Ret	49	(Spain) Axel Pons	Kalex	16	Retirement	11	
Ret	97	(Spain) Xavi Vierge	Tech 3	15	Accident	19	
Ret	19	(Belgium) Xavier Siméon	Speed Up	14	Accident Damage	20	
Ret	73	(Spain) Álex Márquez	Kalex	6	Accident	12	
Ret	94	(Germany) Jonas Folger	Kalex	2	Accident	1	
Ret	60	(Spain) Julián Simón	Speed Up	1	Accident	23	
Ret	57	(Spain) Edgar Pons	Kalex	1	Accident	16	
DNS	7	(Italy) Lorenzo Baldassarri	Kalex		Did not start		

=== Moto3 ===
Pos.	No.	Rider	Manufacturer	Laps	Time/Retired	Grid	Points
1	23	(Italy) Niccolò Antonelli	Honda	18	38:12.161	7	25
2	41	(South Africa) Brad Binder	KTM	18	+0.007	6	20
3	21	(Italy) Francesco Bagnaia	Mahindra	18	+0.148	12	16
4	5	(Italy) Romano Fenati	KTM	18	+0.435	1	13
5	33	(Italy) Enea Bastianini	Honda	18	+0.606	8	11
6	8	(Italy) Nicolò Bulega	KTM	18	+0.625	13	10
7	9	(Spain) Jorge Navarro	Honda	18	+0.674	4	9
8	11	(Belgium) Livio Loi	Honda	18	+1.710	2	8
9	65	(Germany) Philipp Öttl	KTM	18	+8.611	9	7
10	84	(Czech Republic) Jakub Kornfeil	Honda	18	+10.947	16	6
11	95	(France) Jules Danilo	Honda	18	+12.379	22	5
12	36	(Spain) Joan Mir	KTM	18	+12.380	10	4
13	20	(France) Fabio Quartararo	KTM	18	+12.401	3	3
14	64	(Netherlands) Bo Bendsneyder	KTM	18	+12.726	11	2
15	44	(Spain) Arón Canet	Honda	18	+12.784	5	1
16	6	(Spain) María Herrera	KTM	18	+12.939	24	
17	16	(Italy) Andrea Migno	KTM	18	+17.152	19	
18	76	(Japan) Hiroki Ono	Honda	18	+17.367	29	
19	19	(Argentina) Gabriel Rodrigo	KTM	18	+17.451	18	
20	7	(Malaysia) Adam Norrodin	Honda	18	+17.519	27	
21	55	(Italy) Andrea Locatelli	KTM	18	+17.566	20	
22	89	(Malaysia) Khairul Idham Pawi	Honda	18	+17.608	17	
23	40	(South Africa) Darryn Binder	Mahindra	18	+31.939	26	
24	10	(France) Alexis Masbou	Peugeot	18	+31.949	21	
25	58	(Spain) Juan Francisco Guevara	KTM	18	+32.120	15	
26	4	(Italy) Fabio Di Giannantonio	Honda	18	+32.333	28	
27	17	(United Kingdom) John McPhee	Peugeot	18	+32.547	30	
28	24	(Japan) Tatsuki Suzuki	Mahindra	18	+32.812	25	
29	43	(Italy) Stefano Valtulini	Mahindra	18	+34.584	31	
30	98	(Czech Republic) Karel Hanika	Mahindra	18	+59.105	23	
31	77	(Italy) Lorenzo Petrarca	Mahindra	18	+59.109	33	
32	3	(Italy) Fabio Spiranelli	Mahindra	18	+1:34.948	32	
Ret	88	(Spain) Jorge Martín	Mahindra	17	Power Loss	14	

== Championship standings after the race (MotoGP) ==
Below are the standings for the top five riders and constructors after round one has concluded.

Riders' Championship standings

Pos.	Rider	Points
1	(Spain) Jorge Lorenzo	25
2	(Italy) Andrea Dovizioso	20
3	(Spain) Marc Márquez	16
4	(Italy) Valentino Rossi	13
5	(Spain) Dani Pedrosa	11

Constructors' Championship standings

Pos.	Constructor	Points
1	(Japan) Yamaha	25
2	(Italy) Ducati	20
3	(Japan) Honda	16
4	(Japan) Suzuki	10
5	(Italy) Aprilia	3

Teams' Championship standings

Pos.	Team	Points
1	(Japan) Movistar Yamaha MotoGP	38
2	(Japan) Repsol Honda Team	27
3	(Italy) Ducati Team	20
4	(France) Monster Yamaha Tech 3	17
5	(Japan) Team Suzuki Ecstar	15

- Note: Only the top five positions are included for all sets of standings.

== Notes and references ==
=== References ===
Previous race: 2015 Valencian Grand Prix	FIM Grand Prix World Championship; 2016 season	Next race: 2016 Argentine Grand Prix
Previous race: 2015 Qatar Grand Prix	Qatar motorcycle Grand Prix	Next race: 2017 Qatar Grand Prix
