= Highsider =

Motorcycle calamity

A highsider or high-side is a type of motorcycle accident characterized by sudden and violent rotation of the bike around its longitudinal axis. This generally happens when the rear wheel loses traction, skids, and then suddenly regains traction, causing the rider to be thrown head-first from the side of the motorcycle or over the handlebars.

Highsiders differ from lowsiders as follows: during a lowsider, the rear wheel slips laterally and continuously until the bike falls onto its inner, or "low", side, while during a highsider, the rear wheel slips laterally briefly before suddenly regaining traction and flipping the bike onto its outer, or "high" side. As a result, highsiders happen very quickly and violently with little, if any, warning.

== Technical explanation ==
Forces occurring between the motorcycle and the road (such as those that result in accelerating, decelerating and turning) occur at the contact patch through friction and normal forces. There is a limited amount of force tangential to the road that the contact patch can transmit before the tire begins to lose traction, and therefore slide or skid.

When cornering on a motorcycle, centripetal force (in addition to other lateral forces such as acceleration or deceleration) is transferred from the road to the motorcycle through the contact patch, and is directed at a right angle to the path of travel. If the combined net force is greater than the static friction coefficient of the tire multiplied by the normal force of the motorcycle through the tire, the tire will skid outwards from the direction of the curve.

Once a tire slips in a curve, it will begin to move outwards from under the motorcycle. What happens from there depends on how well the rider is able to restore balance and control. If the tire regains traction after the rider starts to skid while the motorcycle is moving sideways, the tire will stop its sideways movement, causing the motorcycle to suddenly jerk into an upright position (and beyond). This movement can easily cause the rider to be thrown off.

The initial traction loss may be caused by:

- A new tire with wax or a similar compound on the sides of the tire tread, or the sides of the tread not having been broken in
- Locking the rear wheel through excessive braking
- An incorrect downshifting technique that produces excessive engine braking, even if the motorcycle has a slipper clutch
- Applying too much throttle when exiting a corner
- Oversteering into the turn by shifting weight to the front wheel and using balance to drift the rear wheel sideways
- Exceeding lateral grip through too much speed (although this is more likely to result in a lowsider), or too much lean
- An unexpected change in surface friction (water, oil, dust, gravel, etc.)
- Reduced rear tire grip via scraping another part of the motorcycle on the road surface

If the wheels are not aligned in the direction of travel when traction is suddenly restored and the rear tire stops slipping, then a highside is likely, depending on how much the bike is turned across the direction of travel and how fast the bike is traveling when the rear tire regains traction. If the angle is high enough, the bike is moving fast enough, and the rear tire slips and regains traction suddenly enough, the rider has no chance of preventing a highside.

== Injury risks ==
The term highsider derives from the side of the motorcycle from which the rider is thrown. If forcibly thrown over the bike, the rider is said to have dismounted on the high side.

- The violent motion of the motorbike usually throws the rider several feet into the air, which can result in broken bones on impact with the road surface.
- As the highsider catches the rider unexpectedly, the rider's limbs can be thrown into protrusions on the bike (usually the handlebars) and suffer contusions.
- The rider may be thrown ahead of the bike and is at risk of being hit and seriously injured by the bike, particularly if the rider stops quickly.

Because highsider accidents are so much more deadly than lowside accidents, the Motorcycle Safety Foundation recommends that if a rider locks the rear brake at higher speeds and the traction is good, the brake should not be released.

== See also ==
- Bicycle and motorcycle dynamics
- Motorcycle safety
