= Engine stand =

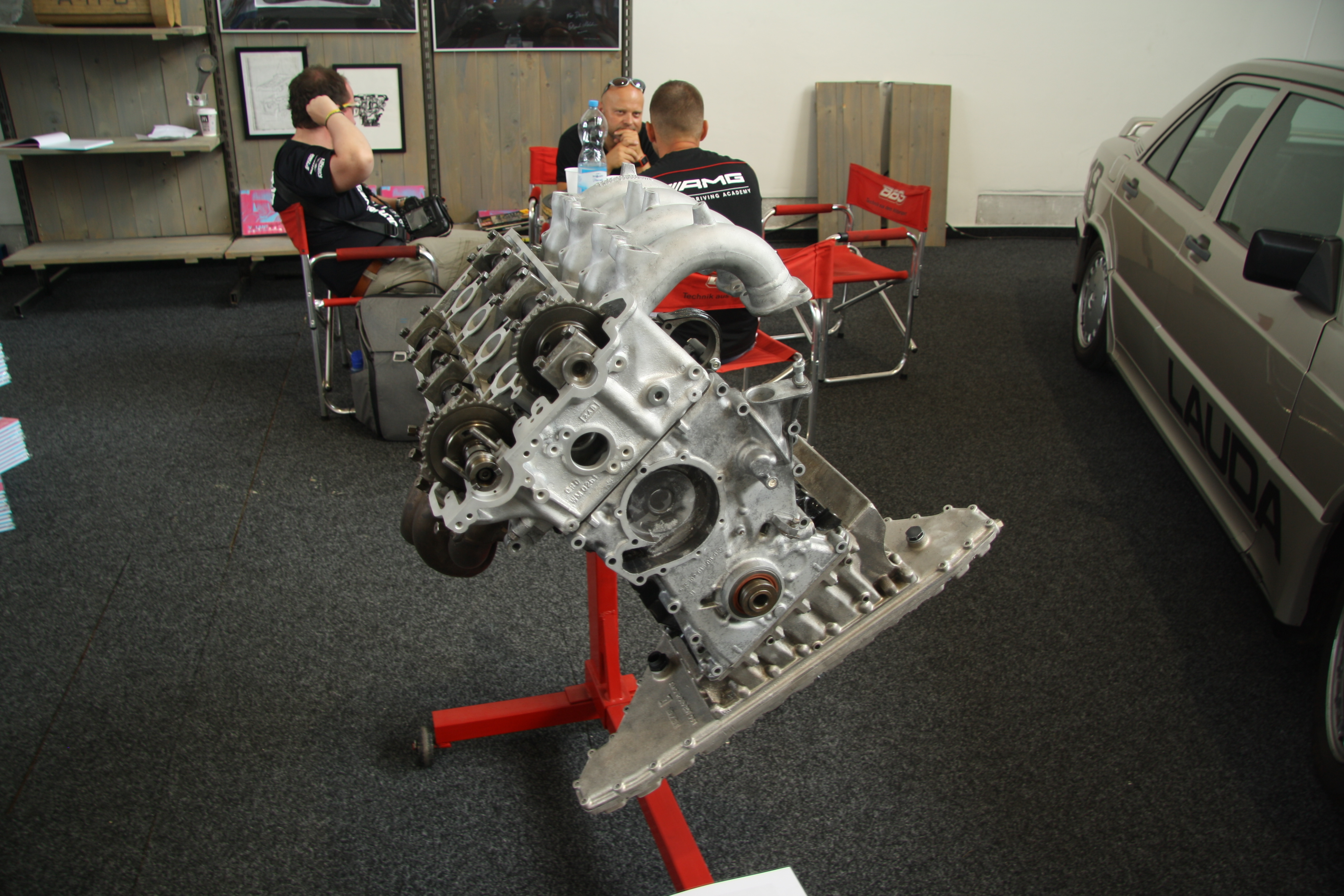
Engine stand (red) holding a partially disassembled combustion engine.

An engine stand is a tool commonly used to repair large heavy gasoline or diesel engines. It uses a heavy cantilevered support structure to hold the engine in midair so that the mechanic has access to any exposed surface of the engine. They are often referred to as cherry pickers. These can be used to take a motor out of or put a motor into a vehicle, as well as mount it to dissect the motor and fix its internal components, without the uncomfortable positions one may encounter working on it while it is still in the engine bay. Many stands feature a rotating mounting head that allows the mechanic to access any part of the engine with ease, making the engine-building process much smoother.

The engine stand is commonly used in combination with the engine crane to remove or install an engine in a vehicle, break in that engine, and perform repairs.

== Motivation ==
While small single-piston engines can commonly be laid on a table for repair, a large engine is normally meant to be supported from its engine mounts or from the flywheel transmission case mounts, and fragile components such as oil pans and valve covers could be crushed if the large engine were placed on a flat surface.

== Construction ==
Engine stands are typically mounted on large casters so than an engine can be moved around the shop to different test and repair stations, and the engine can often be rotated in midair to provide easier access to underside surfaces of the engine. These stands come pre constructed upon purchase. They are welded together with 2 inch or 2 1/2-inch square steel tubing. this gives a ridged frame and great center of balance one the stand is assembled. These stands are coated in either paint, clear coat, or powder coat. Powder coat is wat is most common due to the constant beating they can receive from being in a shop. the powder coat provides a thick layer of protectant that can be easily fixed. originally these stands were constructed with only three casters but had very poor stability. This caused the shift to four caster, two narrow in the front and two wide in the back. This makes it easy to move and very stable.

== Safety standards ==
National and international standards have been developed to standardize the safety and performance requirements for engine stands and other lifting devices. Selection of the standard is an agreement between the purchaser and the manufacturer, and has some significance in the design of the engine stand. In the United States, ASME has developed the Safety Standard for Portable Automotive Service Equipment, last revised in 2014, including requirements for hydraulic hand jacks, engine stands, and other lifting devices.

== Gallery ==
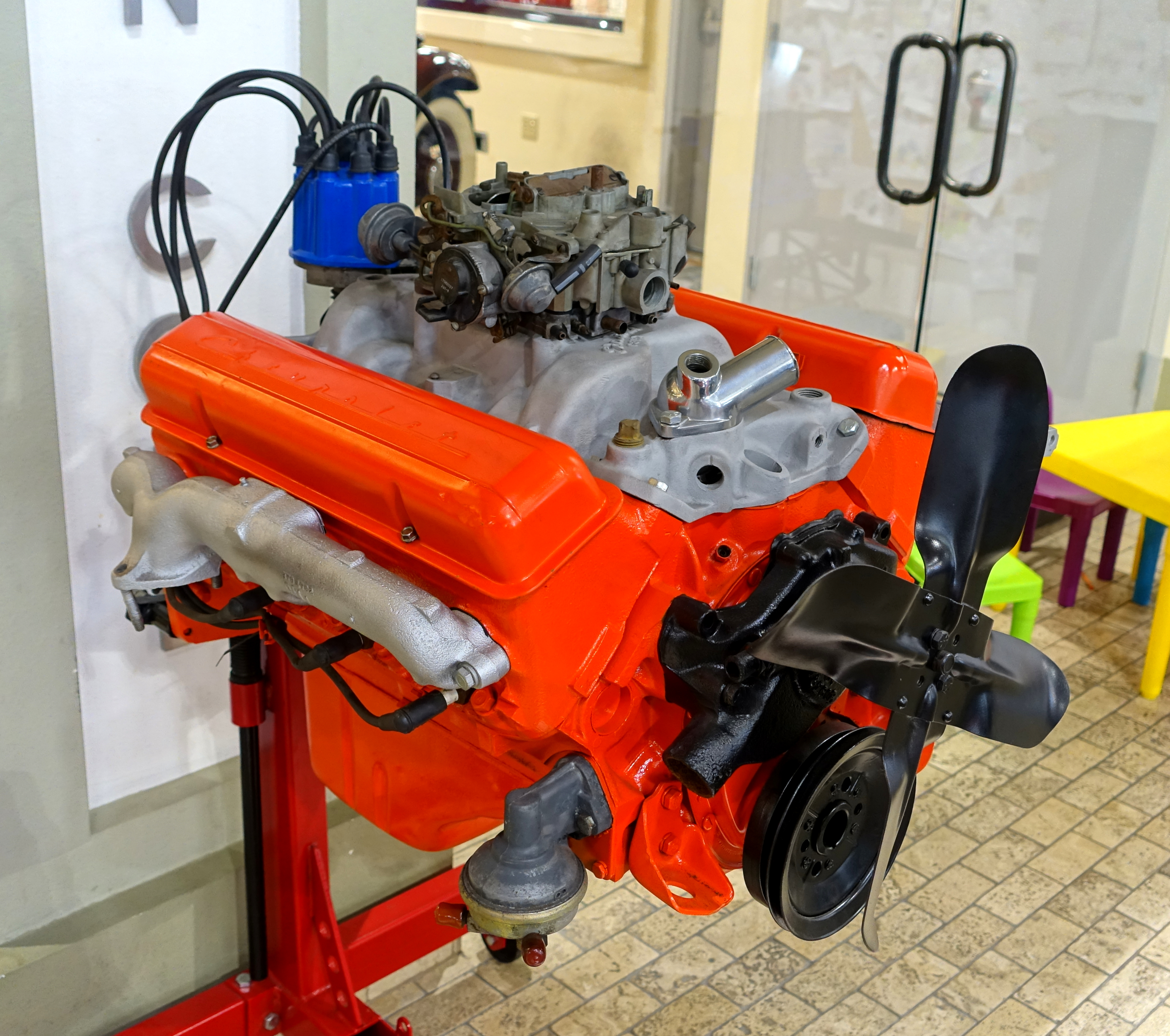
A Chevrolet small-block engine in an engine stand

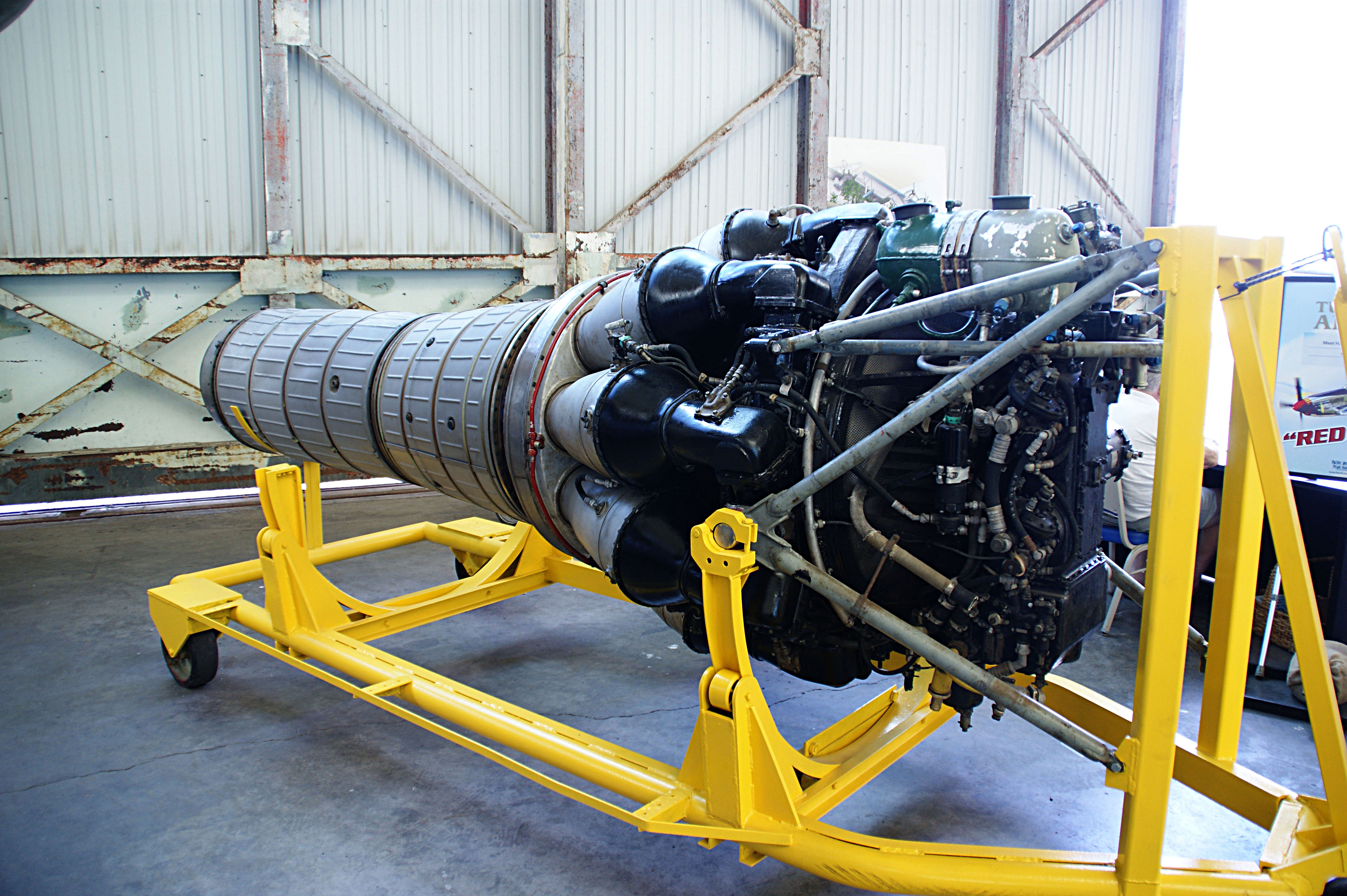
A jet engine in an engine stand

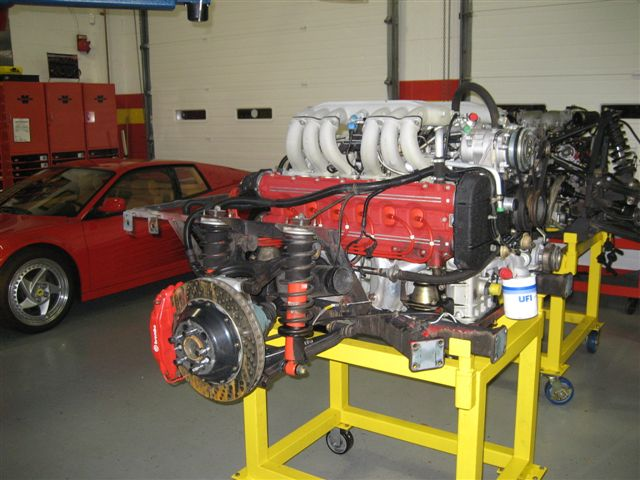
A 12-cylinder Ferrari Testarossa engine in an engine stand

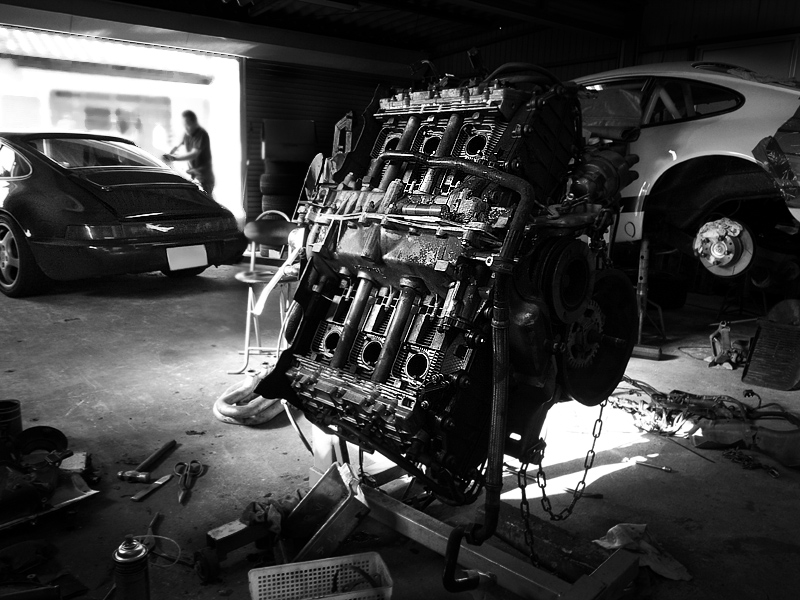
A boxer engine rotated sideways in an engine stand

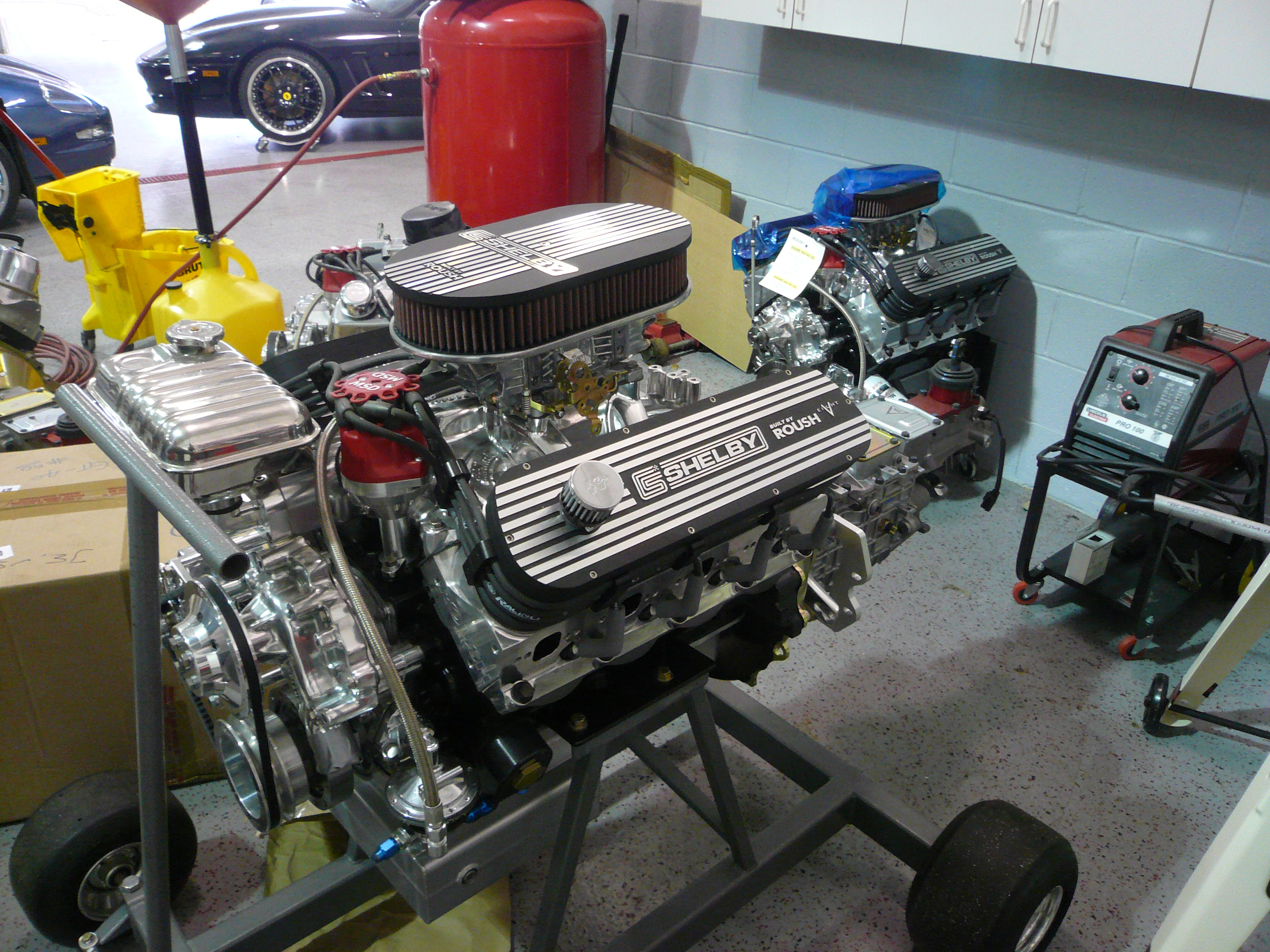
An engine stand with large wheels
