= Engine crane =

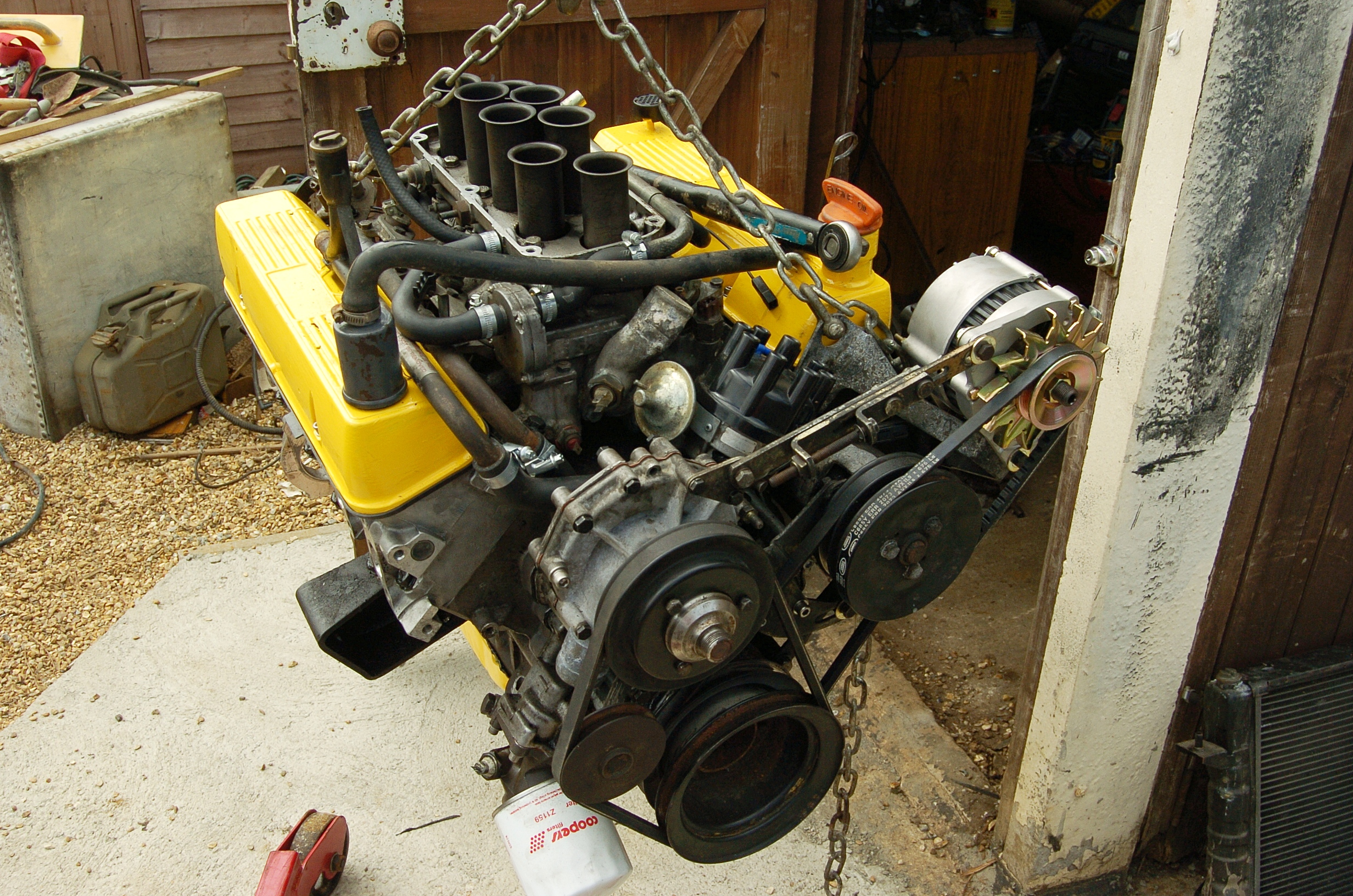
A V8 engine hanging in chains from an engine crane

An engine crane (also referred as engine hoist) is a common repair tool used in vehicle repair shops to remove or install gasoline or diesel engines in small and crowded vehicle engine compartments. It uses a heavy cantilevered support structure to hold the engine in mid-air so that the mechanic can carefully connect or disconnect fragile hoses and wires on the engine to the frame of the vehicle.

The engine crane is commonly used in combination with the engine stand so that the removed engine can be rotated in midair to provide access to underside surfaces of the engine.

== Construction ==
Engine cranes are typically mounted on large casters so that an engine can be lifted straight up out of an engine compartment and then rolled away from the immobile vehicle frame.

Most engine cranes are equipped with a telescopic boom which can be extended to reach engine blocks located further into the engine compartment. At the end of the boom there is a grab hook where lifting chains, slings or a load leveler can be attached for lifting purposes.

== Types of engine cranes ==
Engine cranes/hoists have three commonly used types: hydraulic hoists, chain hoists, and electric chain hoists. The type of engine crane is chosen based on the amount of weight the user is lifting, cost, and convenience.

=== Hydraulic hoist ===
The most commonly used engine crane is the hydraulic hoist. The simplicity of a hydraulic hoist also makes this hoist the most economical engine crane. A hydraulic hoist is generally made of an adjustable arm, hydraulic jack, frame, and a set of legs. The crane arm, with multiple lengths and weight capacities, has a hook on the end that connects a chain to the engine. The arm of the hydraulic engine hoist raises and lowers with the use of a hydraulic jack, which is operated with a bar that pumps the hydraulic jack to raise the arm. To lower the arm, pressure is released from the hydraulic jack. To support the hydraulic arm, a frame with a set of legs stabilizes the weight of the engine. Most hydraulic engine cranes have casters, which help to efficiently relocate the engine crane.

=== Chain hoist ===
Chain hoists are ceiling-mounted engine cranes that are often slower than hydraulic hoists and electric chain hoists. Chain hoists utilize a system of gears and chains to multiply forces that are produced when the operator is pulling the chain to lift the engine. A braking system prevents the engine from unintentionally lowering by the user. Chain hoists are often inexpensive and easy to operate but do require the chain hoist to be mounted, unlike a movable hydraulic hoist.

=== Electric chain hoist ===
The electric chain hoist, also known as the "electric hoist", is the least used type of engine crane. The operation is similar to the chain hoist in the way that chains are used to lift the engine. The electric chain hoist uses an electric motor operated by remote control to lift the engine, unlike the chain hoist where the operator has to manually pull a chain. Although the electric chain hoist is faster in operation, this hoist is also more costly than a chain hoist.

== Gallery ==
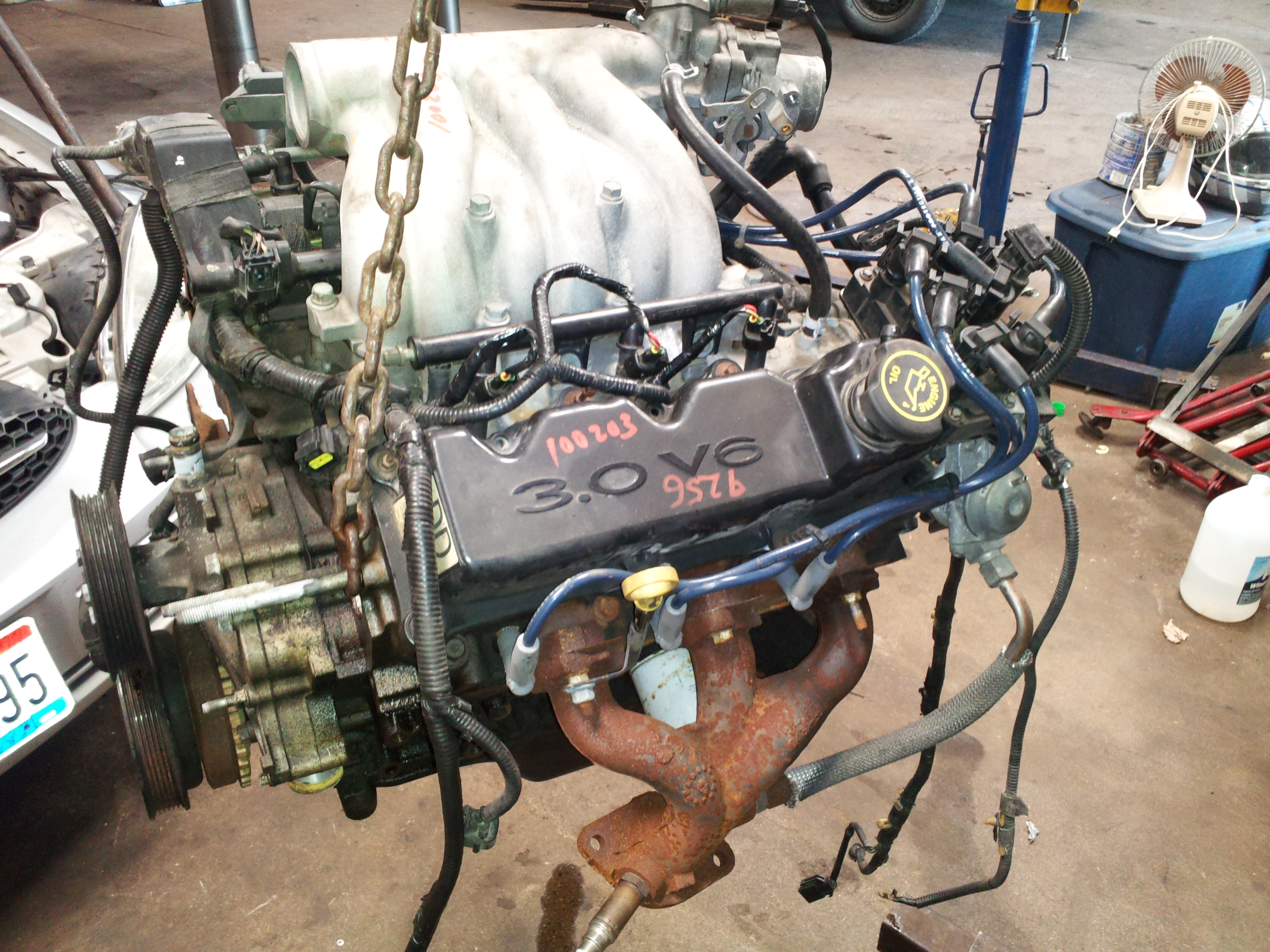
A V6 engine hanging in chains from an engine crane

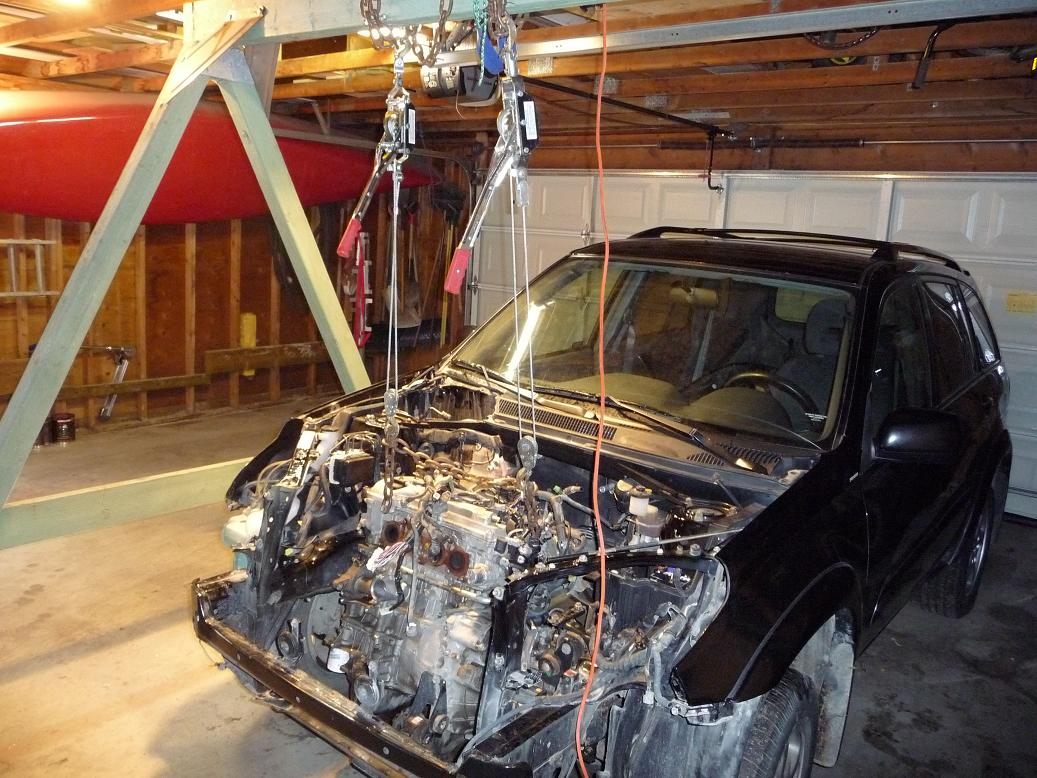
A homemade improvised engine crane (hand driven)

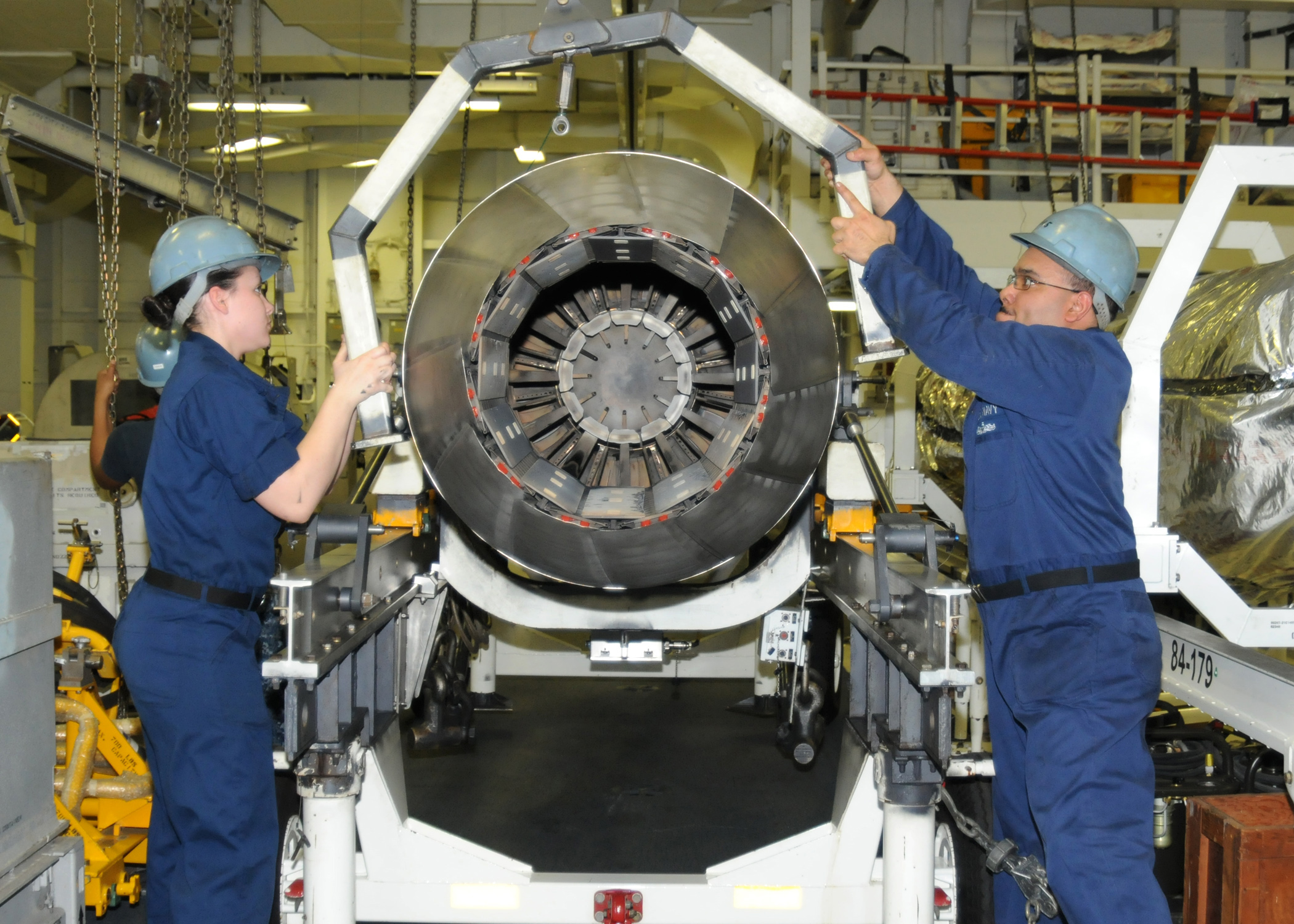
Lifting of a jet engine using a large engine crane

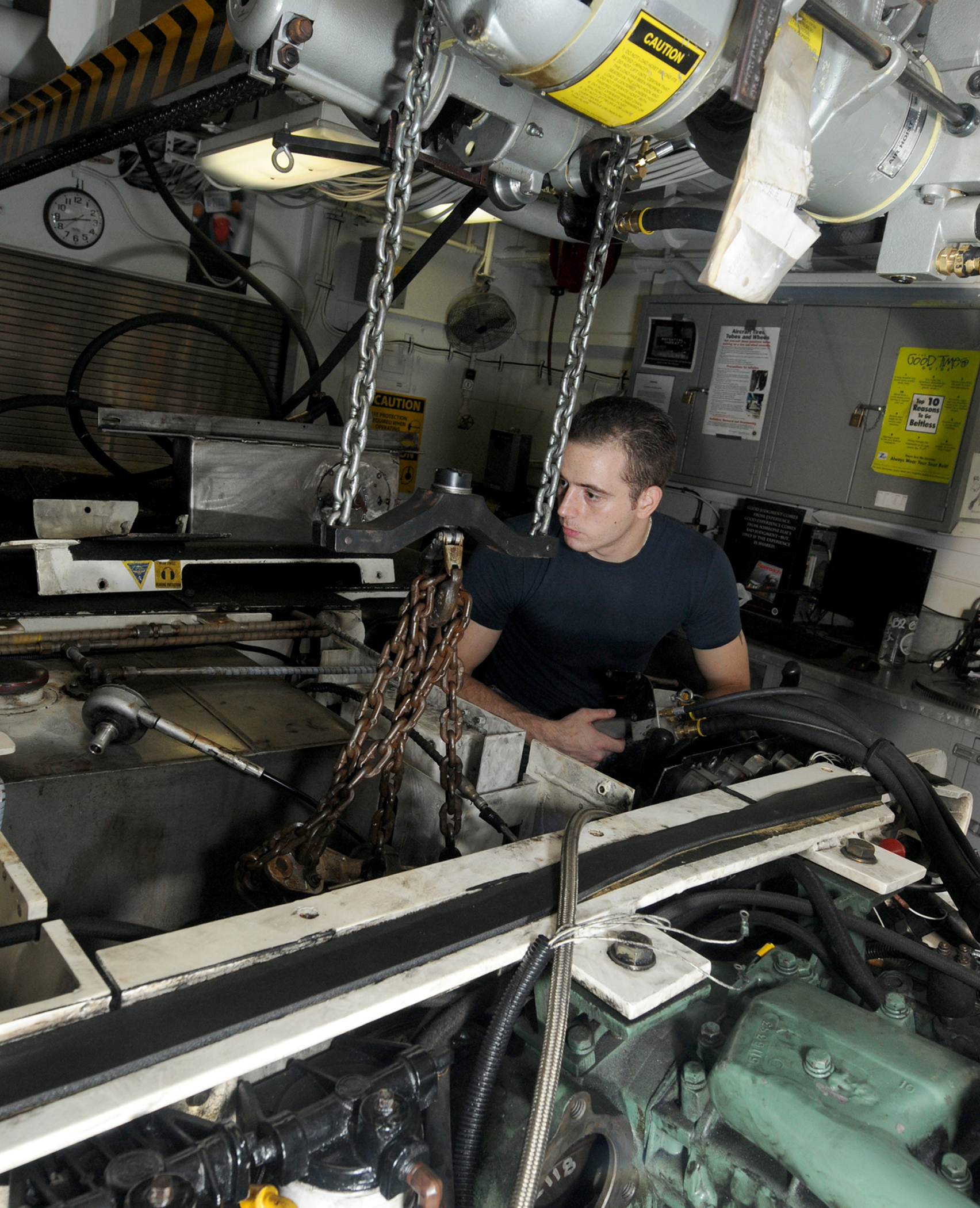
Lifting of an engine

== See also ==
- Engine stand
- Car jack
