= Break-in (mechanical run-in) =

Conditioning of new mechanical equipment

Break-in or breaking in, also known as run-in or running in, is the procedure of conditioning a new piece of equipment by giving it an initial period of running, usually under light load, but sometimes under heavy load or normal load. It is generally a process of moving parts wearing against each other to produce the last small bit of size and shape adjustment that will settle them into a stable relationship for the rest of their working life.

One of the most common examples of break-in is engine break-in for petrol engines and diesel engines.

== Engine break-in ==
A new engine is broken in by following specific driving guidelines during the first few hours of its use. The focus of breaking in an engine is on the contact between the piston rings of the engine and the cylinder wall. There is no universal preparation or set of instructions for breaking in an engine. Most importantly, experts disagree on whether it is better to start engines on high or low power to break them in. While there are still consequences to an unsuccessful break-in, they are harder to quantify on modern engines than on older models. In general, people no longer break in the engines of their own vehicles after purchasing a car or motorcycle, because the process is done in production. It is still common, even today, to find that an owner's manual recommends gentle use at first (often specified as the first 500 or 1000 kilometres or miles). But it is usually only normal use without excessive demands that is specified, as opposed to light/limited use. For example, the manual will specify that the car be driven normally, but not in excess of the highway speed limit.

=== Goal ===
The goal of modern engine break-ins is the settling of piston rings into an engine's cylinder wall. A cylinder wall is not perfectly smooth but has a deliberate slight roughness to help oil adhesion. As the engine is powered up, the piston rings between the pistons and cylinder wall will begin to seal against the wall's small ridges. Additionally older design engines had a flat lifter that was pushed by the camshaft lobes. It needs to spin during operation to avoid excessive wear to the camshaft lobe. At idle speeds on a new engine poor machining tolerances could prevent the lifter from spinning and destroy the camshaft. After 20 minutes of wear, or "self machining" at higher engine speeds they would typically be able to spin freely.

In the past, the engine break-in period was very important to the overall life and durability of the engine. The break-in period required has changed over the years with improved piston ring materials and designs. In reference to small engines, the break-in period now (5–10 hours) is short in comparison with that of engines of the past. Aluminum cylinder bore engine piston rings break-in faster than those used on cast iron cylinder bores.

=== Preparation ===
There are important preparations which must be made before the actual process of running the engine. The break-in can take place either in the vehicle or on an engine stand. Each engine has specific preparation needs of its own due to factors such as the many different types of engine models, the vehicles it belongs to, and conflicting expert instructions. For example, each engine should be lubricated and run on oil specified by its designers which can be found in a manual.

=== Process ===
The main area of controversy among engine break-in instructions is whether to run the engine slowly or quickly to initiate the process. Those who promote raising the power settings steadily will recommend changing the engine setting from low to high powers as to not work the engine too hard and create excessive wear on the cylinder wall (which would require the pistons to be removed and wall fixed). Other experts disagree and believe that to start the engine at a high power is the best way to effectively set in the pistons. The following are examples of how the two processes can be carried out:

==== Start high power ====
Start with revolutions per minute (rpm) between 2500 and 4000, and run the engine for about 20 minutes while watching so that the oil pressure does not get too high, which is dangerous. After changing oil and checking that the engine functions, drive using lower power settings. A high power setting is relative to the vehicle type, so half as many rpm may be necessary if a car has a smaller cylinder wall.

==== Start low power ====
Revolutions per minute should be around 1500 rpm. Run for about half an hour while checking the oil pressure and there should not be any over-boiling of the engine's coolant, which is a combination of air, oil, and water. Once this initial step is completed, drive at varying speeds on the road (or stand) by accelerating between speeds of 30 and 50 miles per hour.

=== Consequences ===
The following are consequences of a bad engine break-in:

- Oil will gather in the cylinder wall, and a vehicle will use much more of it than necessary.
- If a ring does not set into the grooves of the cylinder wall but creates friction against them each time an engine runs, the cylinder wall will be worn out.
- Unsuccessful setting of piston rings into a cylinder wall will result in the necessity of new engine parts, or the entire engine depending on how extensive the damage is.
- Camshaft lobes wear down and are destroyed on flat type lifters in older engine designs.

== Modern versus older break-in regimens ==
For many kinds of equipment (with automotive engines being the prime example), the time it takes to complete break-in procedures has decreased significantly from a number of days to a few hours, for several reasons.

The main reason is that the factories in which they are produced are now capable of better machining and assembly. For example, it is easier to hold tighter tolerances now, and the average surface finish of a new cylinder wall has improved. Manufacturers decades ago were capable of such accuracy and precision, but not with as low a unit cost or with as much ease. Therefore, the average engine made today resembles, in some technical respects, the top-end custom work of back then. Engine design has changed and most engines use roller lifters not flat lifters. For some equipment, break-in is now done at the factory, obviating end-user break-in. This is advantageous for several reasons. It is a selling point with customers who don't want to have to worry about break-in and want full performance "right out of the box". And it also aligns with the fact that compliance rates are always uncertain in the hands of end users. As with medical compliance or regulatory compliance, an authority can give all the instructions it wants, but there is no guarantee that the end user will follow them.

The other reason for shorter break-in regimens today is that a greater amount of science has been applied to the understanding of break-in, and this has led to the realization that some of the old, long, painstaking break-in regimens were based on specious reasoning. People developed elaborate theories on what was needed and why, and it was hard to sift the empirical evidence in trying to test or confirm the theories. Anecdotal evidence and confirmation bias definitely played at least some part. Today engineers can confidently advise users not to put too much stock in old theories of long, elaborate break-in regimens. Some users will not give credence to the engineers and will stick to their own ideas anyway; but their careful break-in beliefs are still harmless and serve roughly like a placebo in allowing them to assure themselves that they've maximized the equipment's working lifespan through their due diligence. Some manufacturers have removed break-in procedures because mechanically they are no longer useful. Other manufacturers list procedures to avoid customer arguments the manual was incomplete because the procedures were missing. The useful side effect of a "break-in at slower speeds" for vehicles is operator familiarization. An overly exuberant operator crashing the new vehicle hurts people, reputation and sales.

== See also ==
- Burn-in of electronic and other equipment
- Break-in for shoes
- Breaking in a horse
