= Lowsider =

Type of motorcycle crash

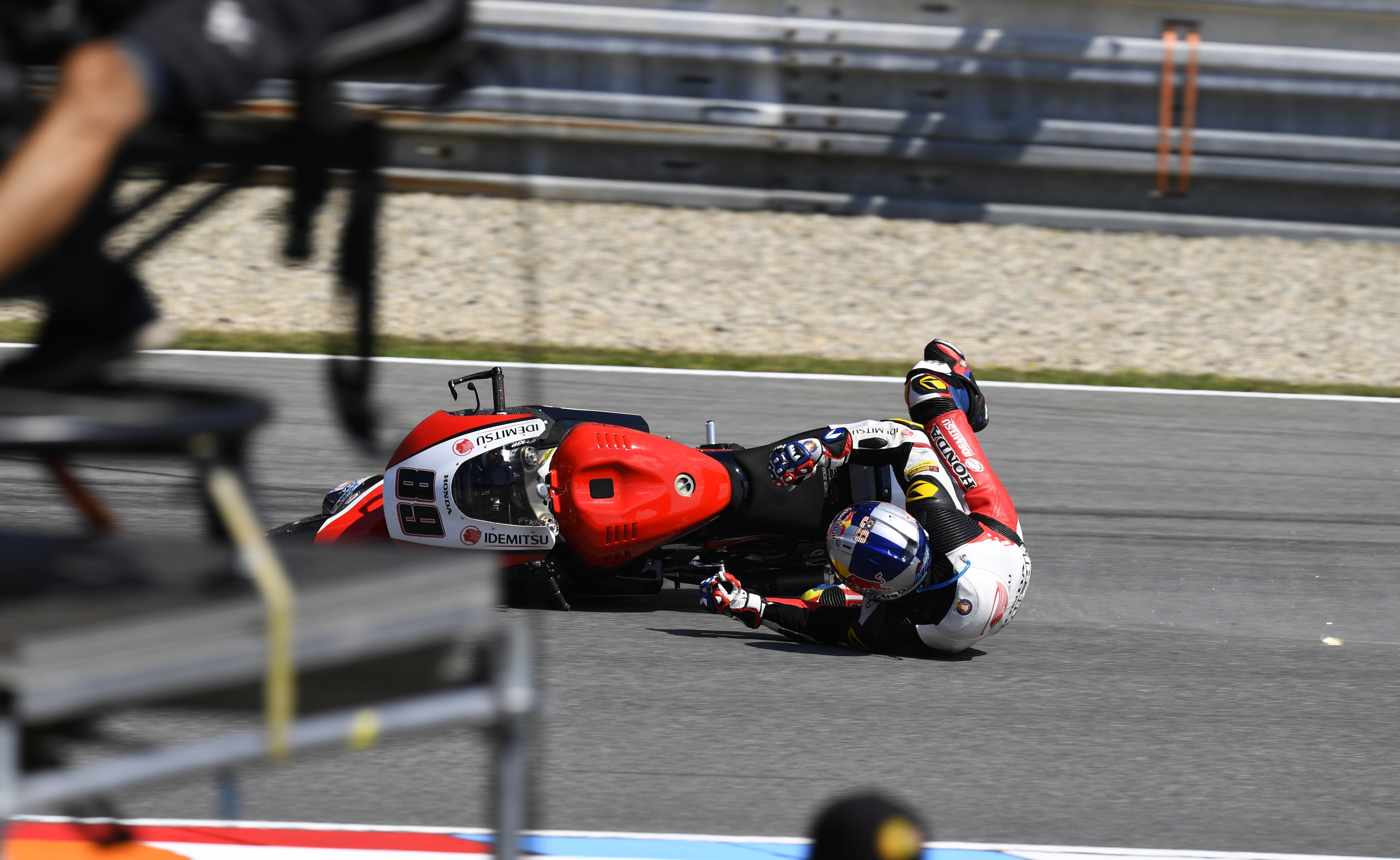
Khairul Idham Pawi right after lowsiding

The lowsider or lowside is a type of motorcycle or bicycle crash usually occurring in a turn. It is caused when either the front or rear wheel slides out as a result of either too much braking into the corner, too much acceleration through or out of the corner, or too much speed carried into or through the corner for the available grip. It may also be caused by unexpected slippery or loose material (such as oil, water, dirt, gravel or leaves) on the road surface.

In the United Kingdom, Canada, New Zealand and Australia it is referred to as a "lowside" rather than a "lowsider".

== Causes of lowsider crashes ==
All horizontal forces occurring between the motorcycle and the road (such as accelerating, decelerating and steering) are transmitted by friction in the contact patches. There is a limited amount of force each contact patch can transmit before the tire begins to slide. Typically, the maximum force once sliding is slightly less than before sliding.

When travelling in a curve, the tires provide the centripetal force needed for the acceleration towards the center of the curve. The capsizing moment provided by gravity acting on the motorcycle's center of mass when leaning into a corner is balanced by a righting moment generated by centripetal forces in the contact patches when all is working correctly. If, having reached a given lean angle, the centripetal forces are reduced then the motorcycle increases its angle of lean until it touches the road surface, usually unseating the rider in the process.

Lowsiders are caused by exceeding the lateral friction limit or by exceeding the combined lateral/longitudinal friction limit in one or more of the following ways:

- Braking force plus turning force exceeds friction available on either tire
- Turning forces exceed the friction available on either tire
- Acceleration force exceeds friction on the rear tire
- Bodywork or peg hitting a road surface lifts the bike causing less friction on either wheel
- Rapid deflation of one of the tires causes grip levels to reduce

Lowsider crashes are not usually caused by braking in a straight line in dry conditions. It is more likely that the rider will go over the handlebars through too much front wheel brake force or will lock the rear wheel resulting in a straight skid. The name derives from the fact that it is the low side of the motorcycle that hits the ground.

== Injury risks ==
Riders are usually advised to do a lowsider rather than a highsider if neither can be avoided. The lowsider has the advantage of the motorcycle sliding before the rider, thus not threatening to crush them. Also, a lowsider tends to send the rider sliding across the road whereas a highsider is considered more severe as it violently throws the rider from the motorcycle with a higher probability of broken bones.

Laying down a bike can still result in significant injuries. When a bike is sliding on its side, the rider has no traction or control. The main injury risks are:

- Gravel rash due to sliding across the road surface at speed
- Hitting traffic coming in the opposing lane
- Impact injuries on the side the rider goes down (usually an elbow, shoulder or hip contusion, but the bike landing on an ankle can cause injuries, too)
- Hitting static objects on the side of the road such as street furniture or signage

== See also ==
- Highsider
- Bicycle and motorcycle dynamics
- Motorcycle safety
