= Loose wheel nut indicator =

Device detecting loose nuts in vehicles

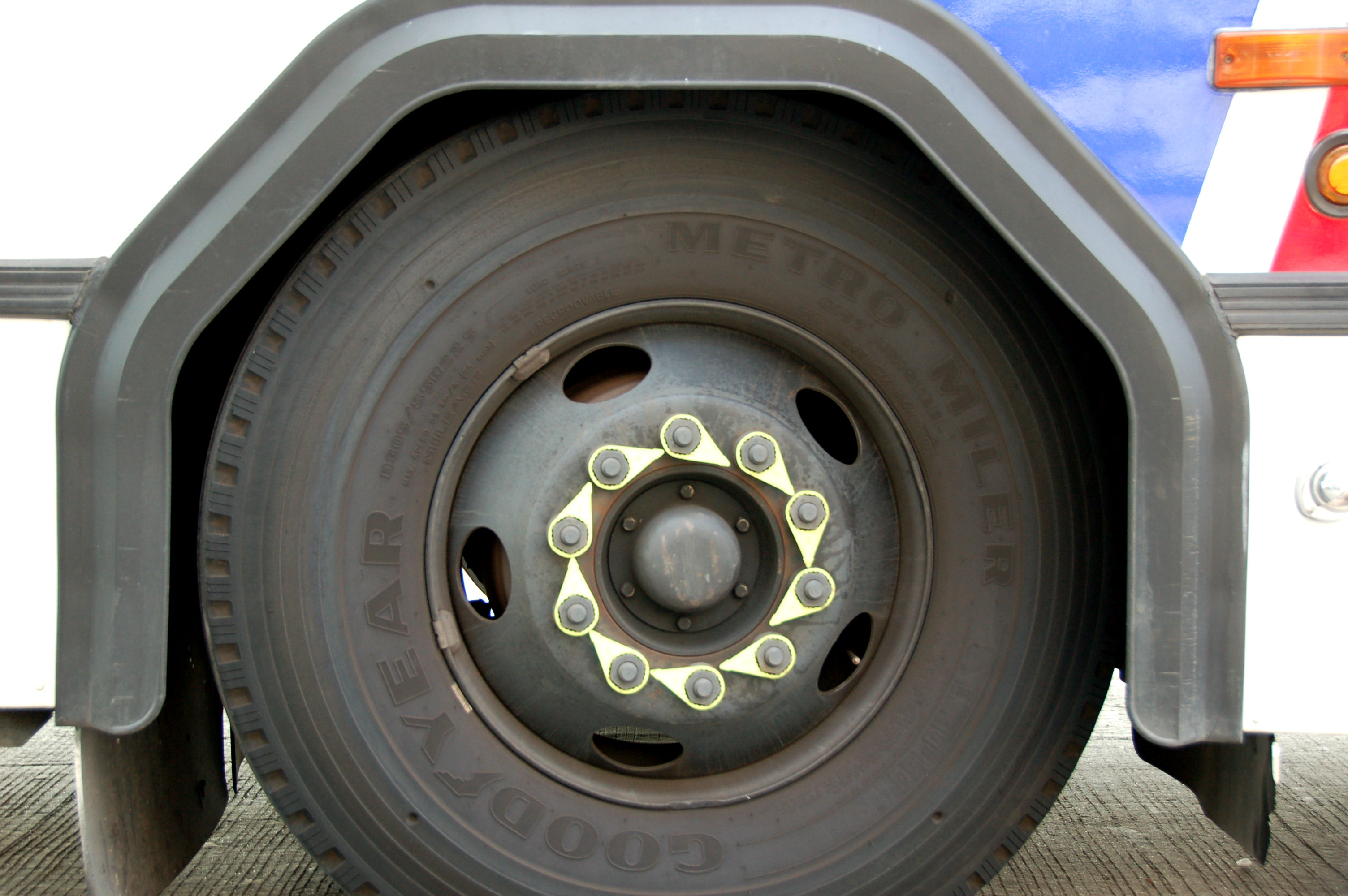
Loose wheel nut indicators – proper torque visual indicator

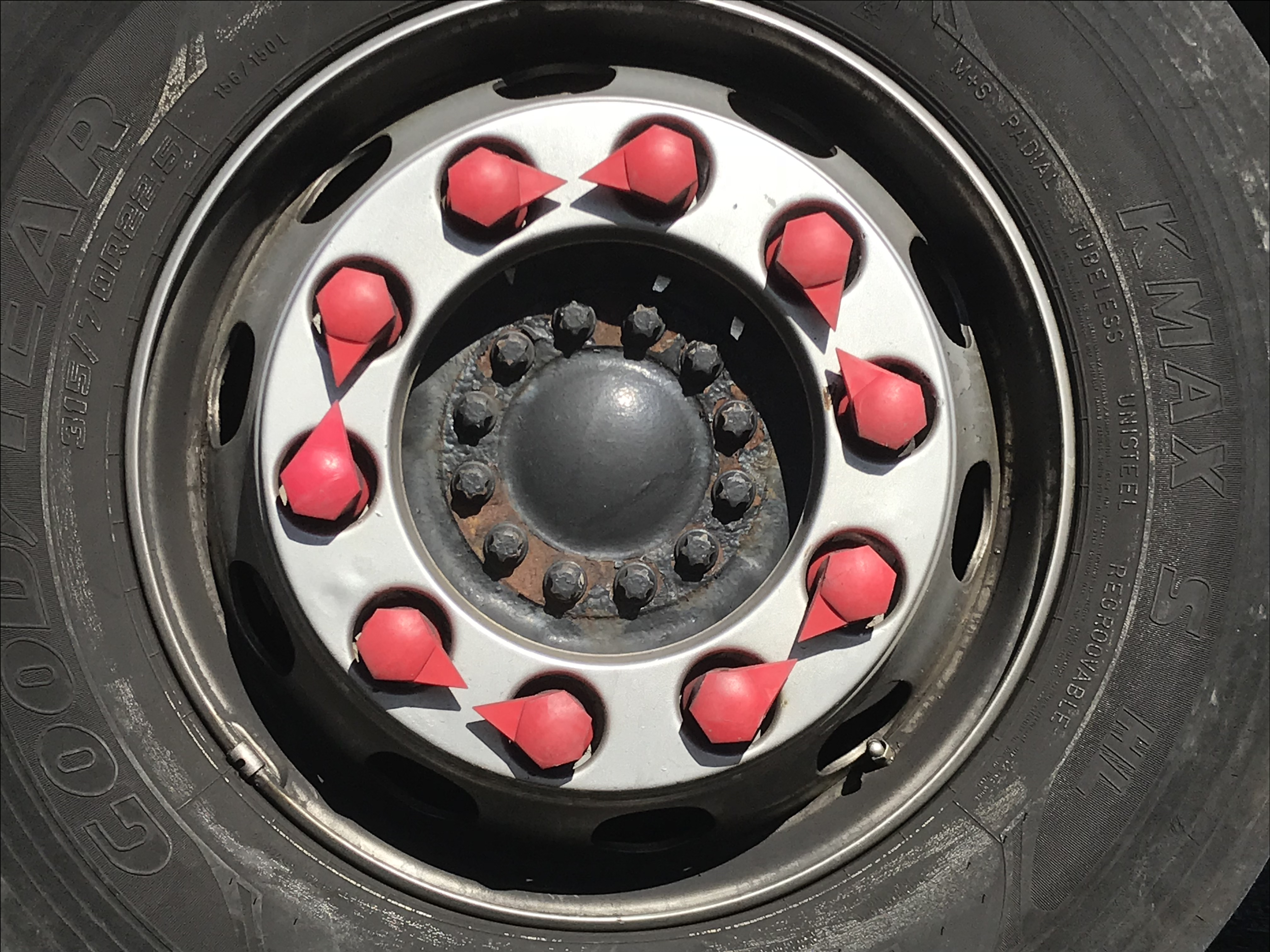
Wheel nut indicators on a truck showing all nuts are as they were left

A loose wheel nut indicator is a measuring device that warns of loose wheel nuts, which is the most common cause of wheels on vehicles falling off.

== History ==
In 1990, Mike Marczynski, who was responsible for a commercial vehicle fleet, developed the locking system for lug nuts and initially marketed them in Great Britain under the Checkpoint brand name. The product is now available in more than 90 countries on 6 continents. The product has also established itself in Germany, and trucks with the safety system can be seen frequently on the Autobahn. The original product has been supplemented by other products which combine the function of a lug nut indicator with a dust cap, providing additional corrosion protection for bolts and nuts.

Wheel overheating due to problems with the brakes and/or bearings is a common problem for vehicle operators. To solve this problem and improve the safety of vehicles using the products, indicators equipped with an overheat indicator have been developed. For this purpose, specific polymers were used, which first deform and then melt at elevated temperatures. Lug nut indicators made of a material that can withstand high temperatures were developed especially for the needs of rescue vehicles, where the driving and braking behavior is significantly different. Its melting point of 165 °C is considerably higher than that of the standard version (melting point at approx. 125 °C).

== Operation ==
The indicators are attached such that the indicator tips are all aligned in a consistent pattern. This may be clockwise, the direction of forward rotation, or pairs of adjacent indicator tips pointing towards each other. Should a lug nut become loose, the pointer will move with the lug nut, i.e. the tip will no longer be aligned to the pattern. The wheel nut indicators allow not only a quick and efficient check of the wheels by the driver, but also by control authorities. In addition, the inspection can be easily documented with a photo.

== Mechanical indicator ==
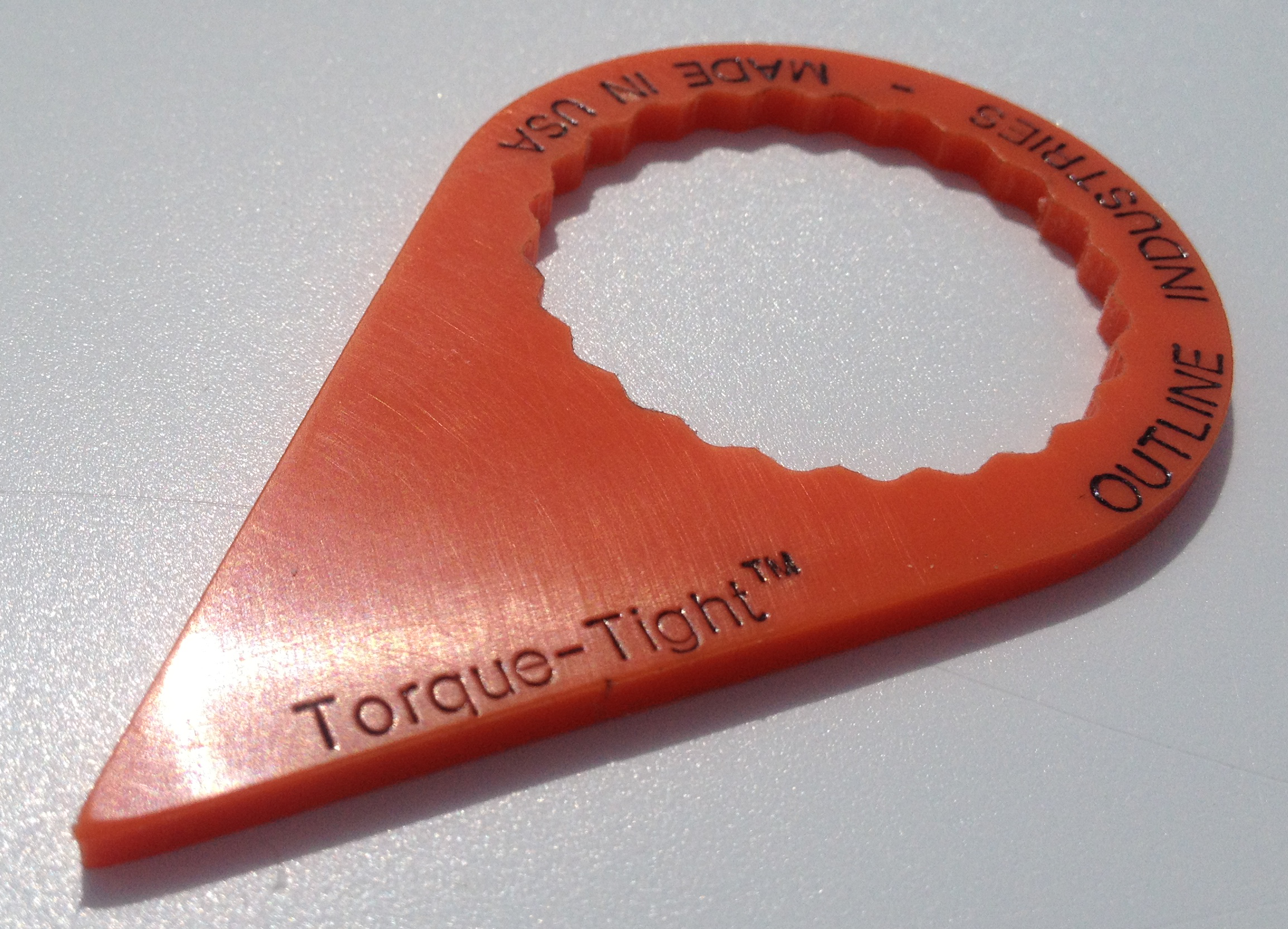
A single wheel nut indicator

A common type of loose wheel nut indicators is small pointed tags, often made of fluorescent orange or yellow plastic. They are fixed to the lug nuts of the wheels of large vehicles. The tag rotates with the nut, and if the nut becomes loose, the point of the tag shifts noticeably out of alignment with the other tags. If too many lug nuts are loosened, the wheel can detach from the vehicle; loose wheel nut indicators allow identification of loose nuts before this can occur.

Loose wheel nut indicators or lug nut indicators are used both by auto mechanics and drivers to identify lug nuts which require tightening, as well as by accident investigators to detect faults after accidents. Although generally not compulsory, road safety bodies frequently recommend their use, especially on large or heavy vehicles such as buses, coaches, large vans, and trucks.

== Electronic sensor ==
Advancements in anti-lock braking systems (ABS) have made it possible to detect loose wheel nuts by using sensors from the ABS system in the car's software. The system functions by detecting and recognizing vibrations which could indicate a loose wheel.

In 2018, Audi launched electronic wheel nut indicators on some of their more expensive models, and by 2021 Audi had sold over 1 million cars with the technology.

== See also ==
- Tire-pressure monitoring system
