= Center cap =

Decorative disk on a wheel that covers a central portion of the wheel

Ford Explorer Center Cap (1999-2001), shown mounted to a cast aluminum wheel

A center cap, or centercap is a decorative disk on an automobile wheel that covers a central portion of the wheel. Early center caps for automobiles were small and primarily served the purpose of keeping dirt away from the spindle nut and wheel bearings of vehicles. Center caps are often found on new cars to hide the lug nuts, and/or the bearing. Center caps are a type of hubcap, the other primary type being wheel covers. Some modern center caps are retained to the wheel using spring clips, while others are retained by the wheel lugs or other threaded fasteners.

== History ==
Early center caps were usually either very small, or very large. They started on cartwheels and wagons and slowly evolved into what we know them as today. Many of the center caps from the 1950s to the 1970s were made of stainless steel. The rest of the wheel was originally of wood or many fitted metal parts. In modern times, center caps are both metal and plastic, and are typically used with aluminum alloy or styled steel wheels. Some full wheel covers use removable center caps, typically those retained by lug nuts, with the center cap's purpose to hide the lug nuts that are securing the wheel to the vehicle's hub.

== Characteristics and design ==
Often a center cap will bear the logo or trademark of the maker of the automobile or the maker of the center cap, but there are custom center caps without any trademark as well. Early center caps were often chrome plated.

Center caps that are found on trucks are known as "baby moon" center caps; they originated on Mack Trucks and are now found on Freightliner Trucks.

== See also ==
- List of auto parts
