= Wheel stud =

Motor vehicle part

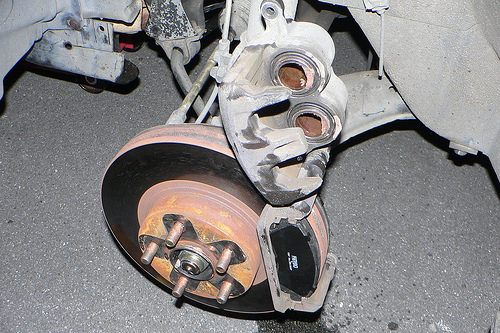
Wheel hub with disc brake and 5 wheel studs

Wheel studs are the threaded fasteners that hold on the wheels of many automobiles. They are semi-permanently mounted directly to the vehicle hub, usually through the brake drum or brake disk. Lug nuts are fastened onto the wheel stud to secure the wheel. When a wheel is removed for tire changes etc., the stud remains in the hub.

Many automobiles instead use bolts to do this, where removable bolts screw into the wheel hub.

Wheel studs can be either factory equipment or aftermarket add-ons.

== Benefits of studs vs. bolts ==
The primary advantage of wheel studs over wheel bolts is greater ease for tire changes by creating the ability to lift both the wheel and tire onto the studs creating the ability to hold and locate the assembly during tire changes rather than trying to hold up the wheel and tire while lining up the holes to insert a bolt. Many wheels that use bolts also have one or more small locator pins to assist this: the wheel is lifted onto the pins, then the bolts inserted. Once the bolts are tightened and the wheel is fully installed, the pins have no further function whilst the vehicle is being driven.

Another advantage of using wheel studs is that they are replaceable and usually require fewer parts for replacement in case of stripped threads. With lug bolts, on the other hand, the whole hub usually has to be replaced in case of stripped threads in the hub.

One motivation for using lug bolts instead of wheel studs and nuts the number of parts that needs to be attached to the wheel hub. Wheel studs and lug nuts consist of two parts, while the lug bolt is a single part. This leads to one less part when using lug bolts, which can save manufacturing costs.

=== Torque specifications ===
The application of proper torque to lug nuts on wheel studs is important for wheel retention safety. Insufficient torque may allow wheels to loosen during operation, while excessive torque can damage threads or lead to stud failure. The specific torque values vary by vehicle size and manufacturer specifications. When working with wheel studs, torque is typically applied in a cross or star pattern to ensure even clamping force distribution across the wheel surface.

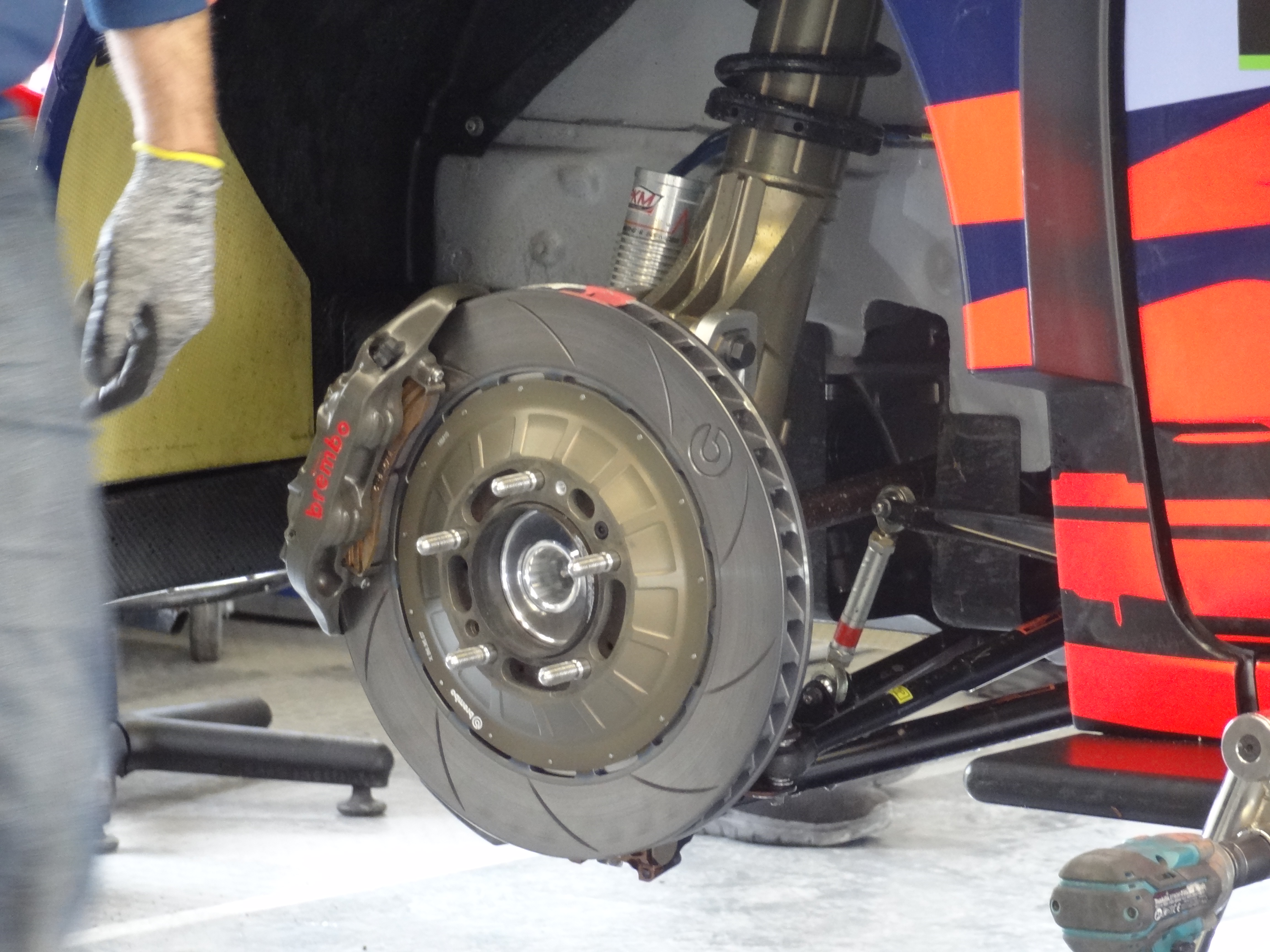
Car with wheel studs for use with lug nuts

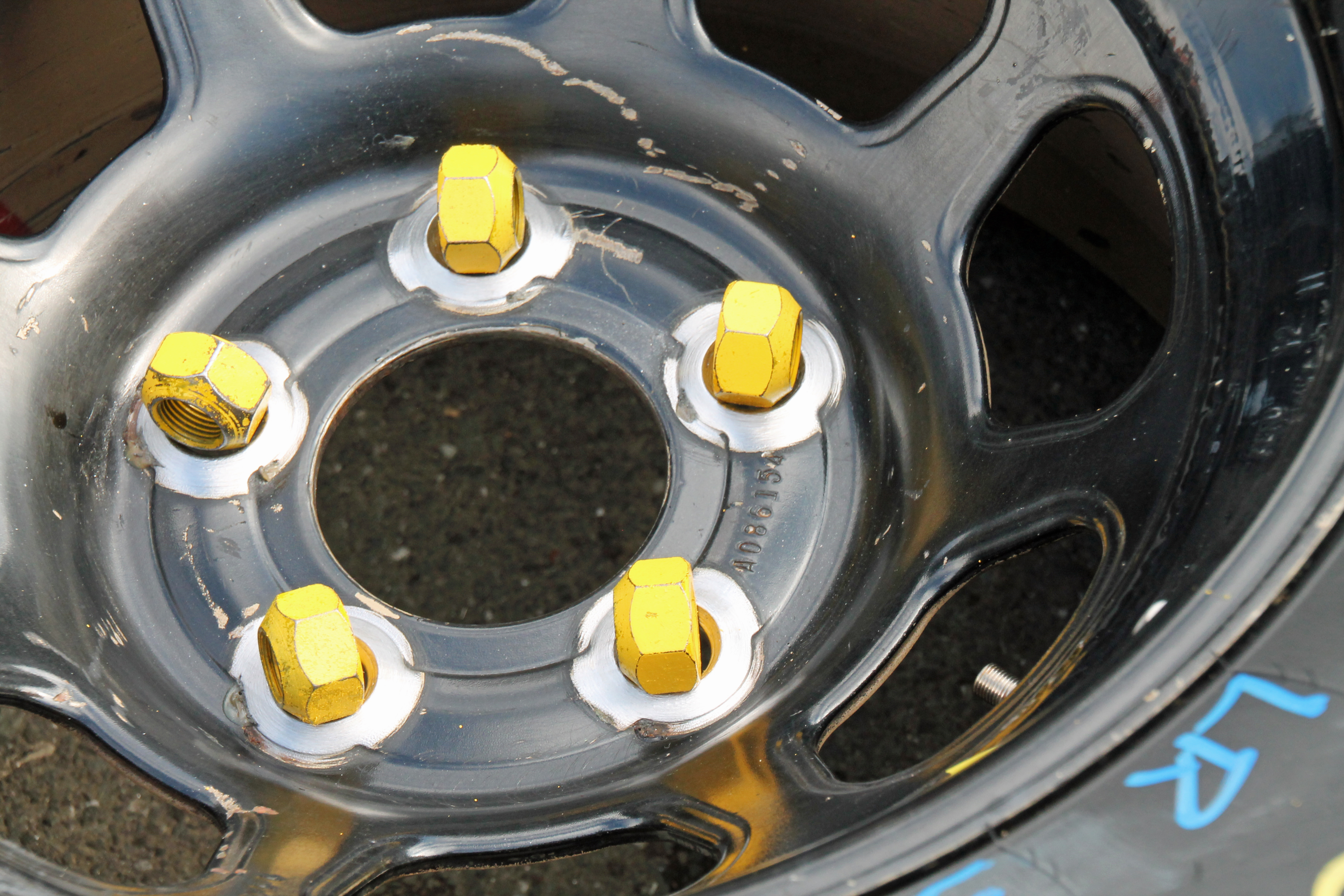
Five yellow lug nuts for use on a car with wheel studs

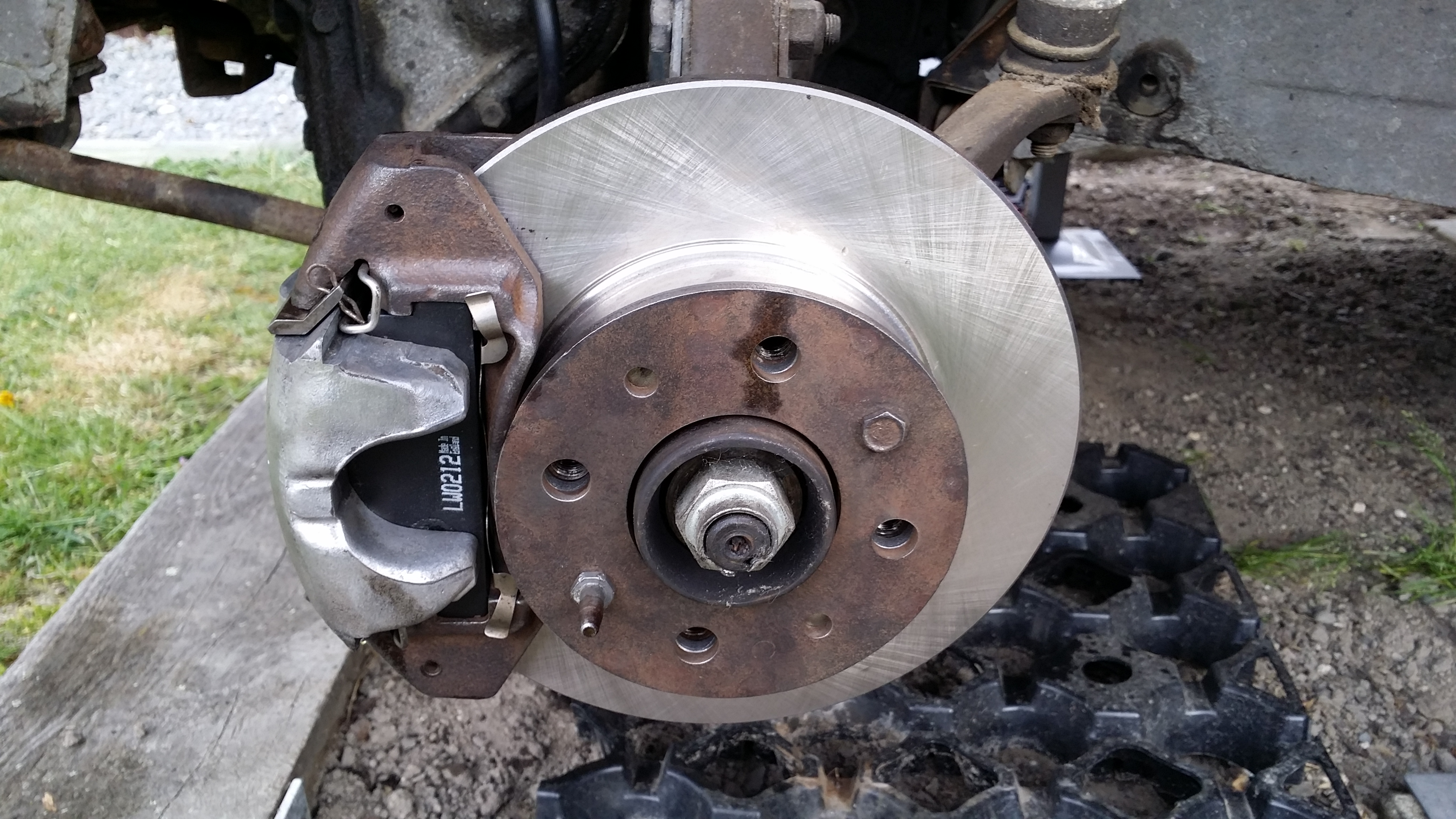
Car without wheel studs for use with lug bolts

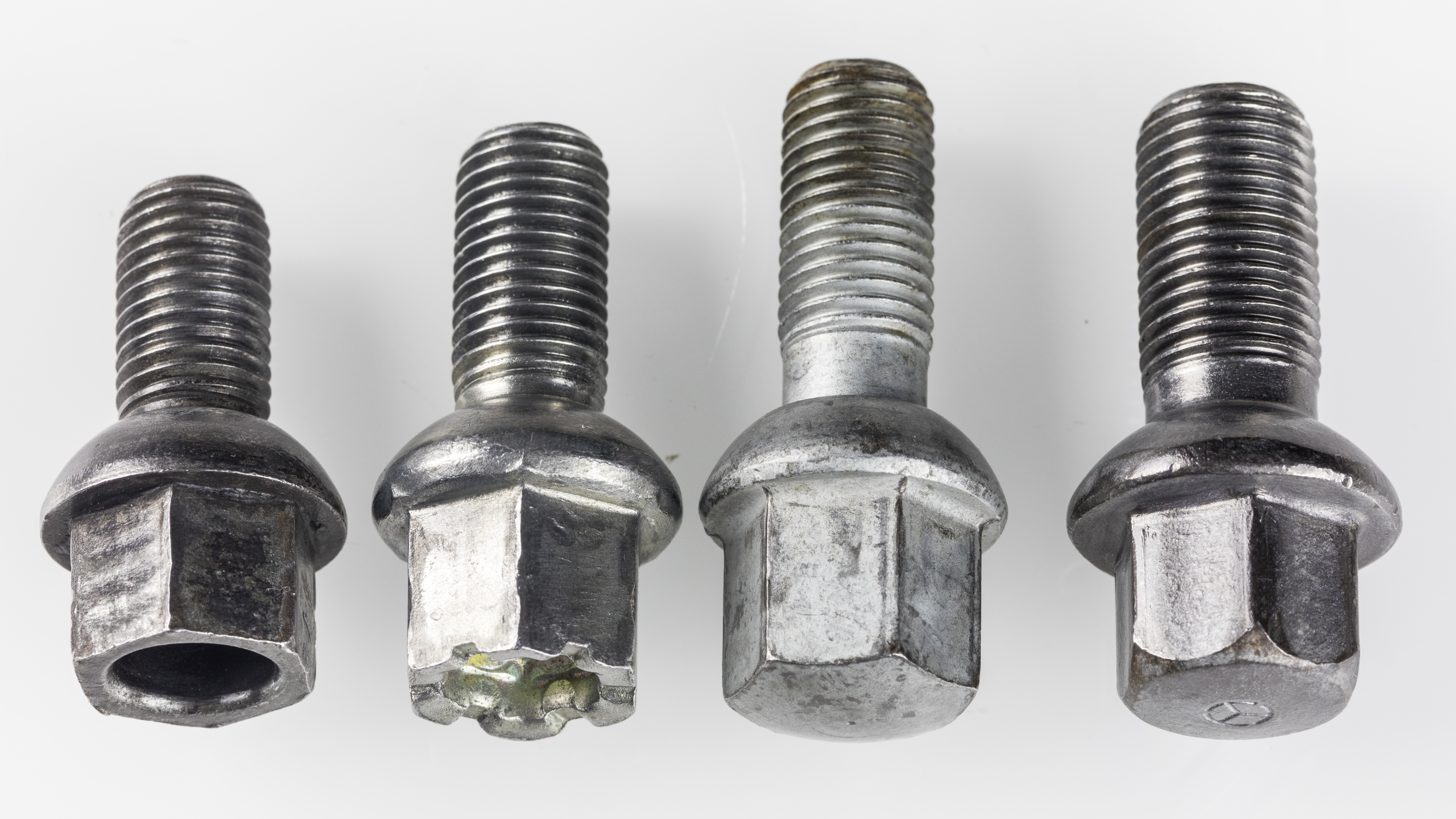
Four lug bolts, from left: Three M12x1.5 mm bolts with different length and one M14x1.5 mm bolt

== Types ==
Wheel studs are replaceable and come in two basic kinds: press-in and screw-in. Welded-in studs are possible but unlikely to be encountered.

=== Screw-in ===
Screw-in studs simply screw into the existing threaded bolt hole in the hub. The end that screws into the hub is usually either threaded with a smaller tolerance (tighter fit) or installed with a chemical thread-locking fluid to keep it from backing out from the hub when the lug nut is removed.

=== Press-in ===
Press-in studs are installed from the back side of the disk or drum hub and may require removal of the hub from the vehicle for installation or removal. They consist of a threaded portion and a larger diameter section, called the knurl, that is splined to prevent rotation. The diameter of the knurl is larger than the hole in the hub requiring a press fit to seat the stud. The stud is prevented from being pulled through the hub by a larger diameter stop on the end.

Most press-in studs are designed and recommended to be installed with a mechanical or hydraulic press to ensure proper seating without damage. It is possible, though not advised, to install a press-in by using a washer and nut to "draw" it into the hub. In doing so, the installer must ensure that the stud is fully seated and that no damage is done to the threaded portion of the stud. While a common installation method by many garage mechanics, this method puts excessive strain on the stud, and can cause it to stretch and fatigue, which could lead to premature failure.

== Aftermarket wheel studs ==
Aftermarket wheel studs offer the ability to mount a wheel that is not factory supplied to that vehicle. Screw-in studs with a larger than original threaded diameter portion permit mounting of wheels with larger diameter holes. Wheel studs of longer length allow the use of wheel spacers to move a wheel further out to compensate for rubbing or backspacing issues, to make the wheel look like it is larger than factory standard, or to increase the track width of the car.
