= Lug nut =

Fastener, specifically a nut, used to secure a wheel on a vehicle

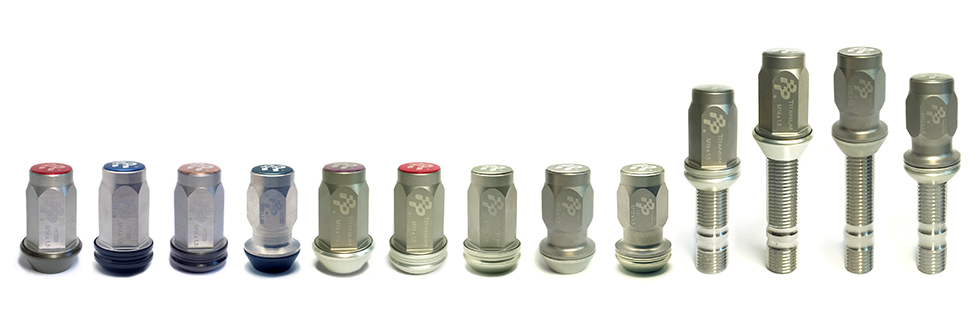
From left: 9 lug nuts and 4 lug nut attached to screw-in wheel studs.

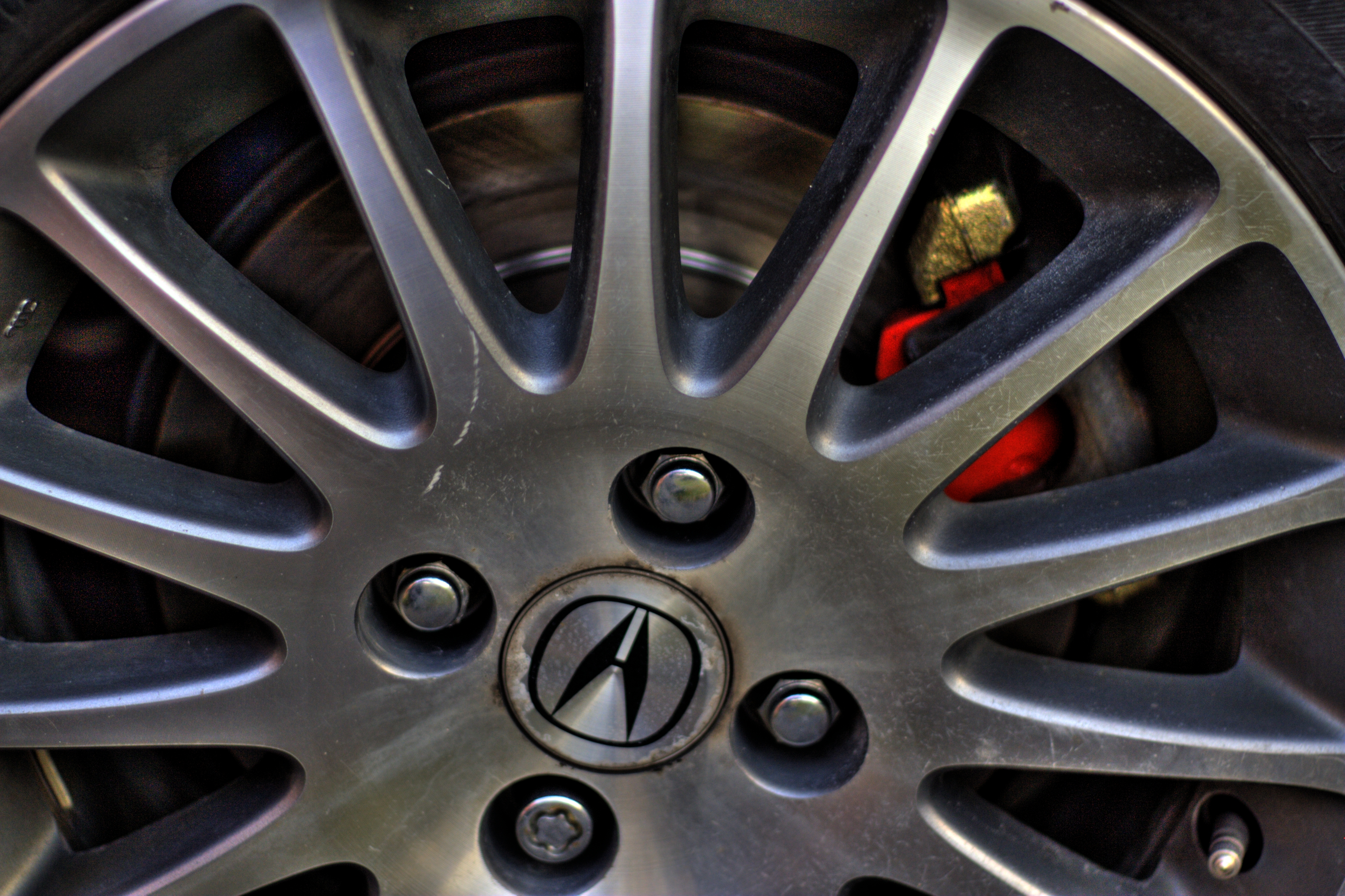
A bolt circle with four lug nuts on an Acura.

A lug nut or wheel nut is a fastener, specifically a nut, used to secure a wheel on a vehicle. Typically, lug nuts are found on automobiles, trucks (lorries), and other large vehicles using rubber tires.

== Design ==
A lug nut is a nut fastener with one rounded or conical (tapered) end, used on steel and most aluminum wheels. A set of lug nuts is typically used to secure a wheel to threaded wheel studs and thereby to a vehicle's axles. Some designs (Audi, BMW, Mercedes-Benz, Saab, Volkswagen) use lug bolts or wheel bolts instead of nuts, which screw into a tapped (threaded) hole in the wheel's hub or brake drum or brake disc.

The conical lug's taper is normally 60 degrees (although 45 degrees is common for wheels designed for racing applications), and is designed to help center the wheel accurately on the axle, and to reduce the tendency for the nut to loosen due to fretting induced precession, as the car is driven. One alternative to the conical lug seating design is the rounded, hemispherical, or ball seat. Automotive manufacturers such as Audi, BMW, and Honda use this design rather than a tapered seat, but the nut performs the same function. Older style (non-ferrous) alloy wheels use nuts with a 13 to 25 mm (1/2 to 1 in) cylindrical shank slipping into the wheel to center it and a washer that applies pressure to clamp the wheel to the axle.

Wheel lug nuts may have different shapes. Aftermarket alloy and forged wheels often require specific lug nuts to match their mounting holes, so it is often necessary to get a new set of lug nuts when the wheels are changed.

There are four common lug nut types:

1. cone seat
2. bulge cone seat
3. under hub cap
4. spline drive.

The lug nut thread type varies between car brands and models. Examples of commonly used metric threads include:

- M10×1.25 mm
- M12 (1.25, 1.5 or 1.75 mm thread pitch, with M12x1.5 mm being the most common)
- M14 (1.25, 1.5 or 2 mm pitch, with M14×1.5 mm being the most common
- M16×1.5 mm

Some older American cars use inch threads, for example 7/16″-20 (11.1 mm), 1/2″-20 (12.7 mm), or 9/16″-20 (14.3 mm).

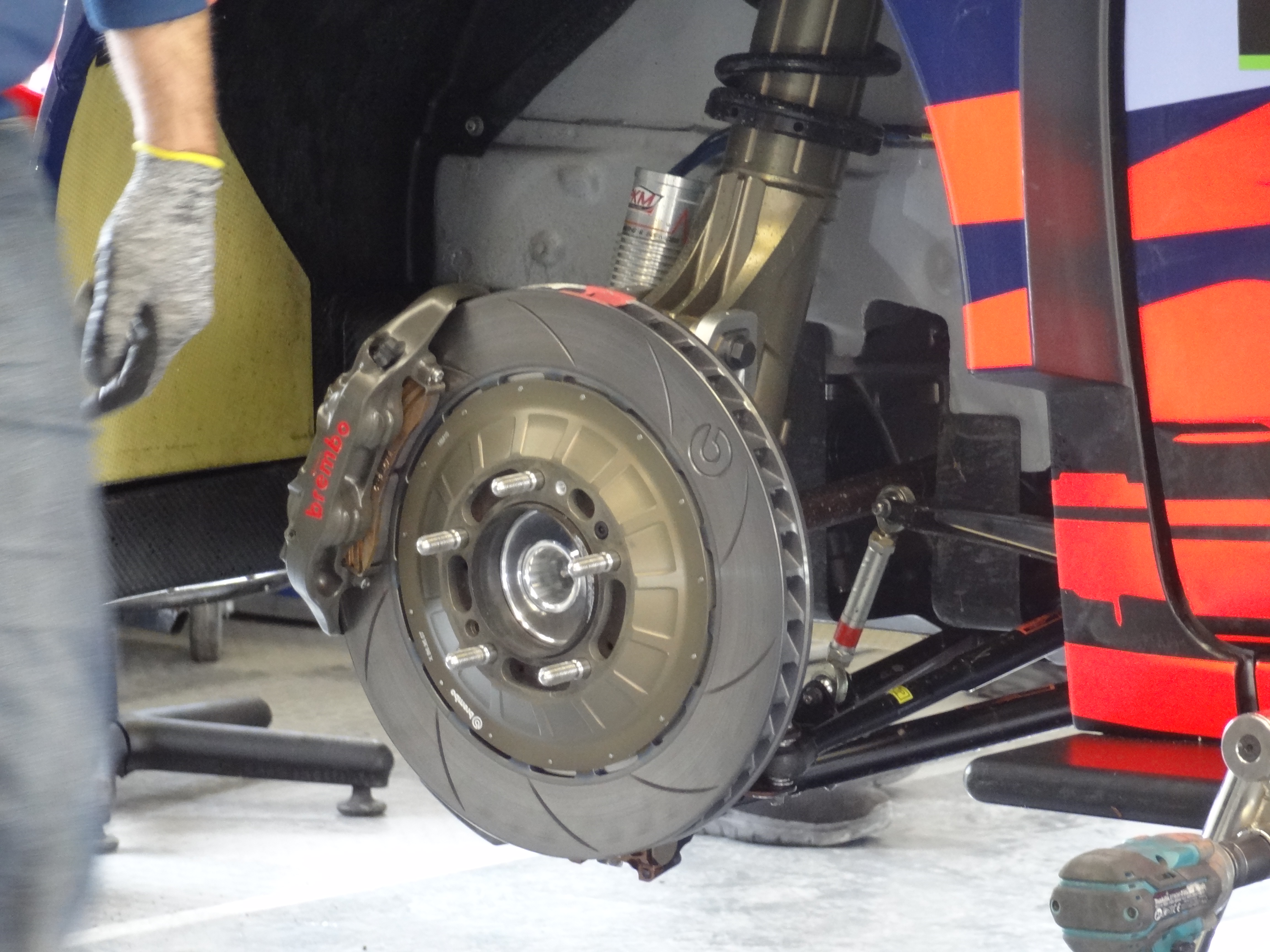
Car with wheel studs for use with lug nuts

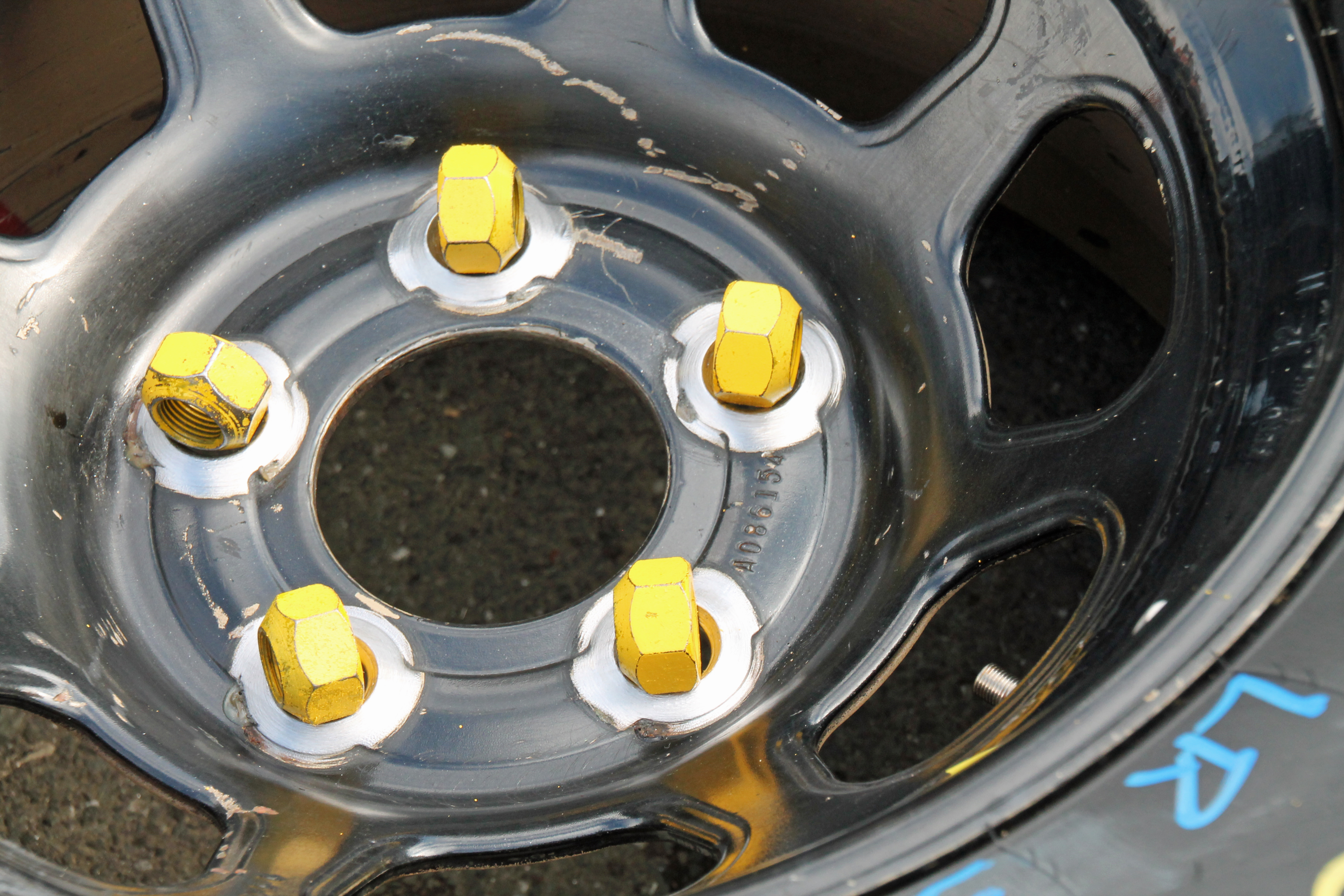
Five yellow lug nuts for use on a car with wheel studs

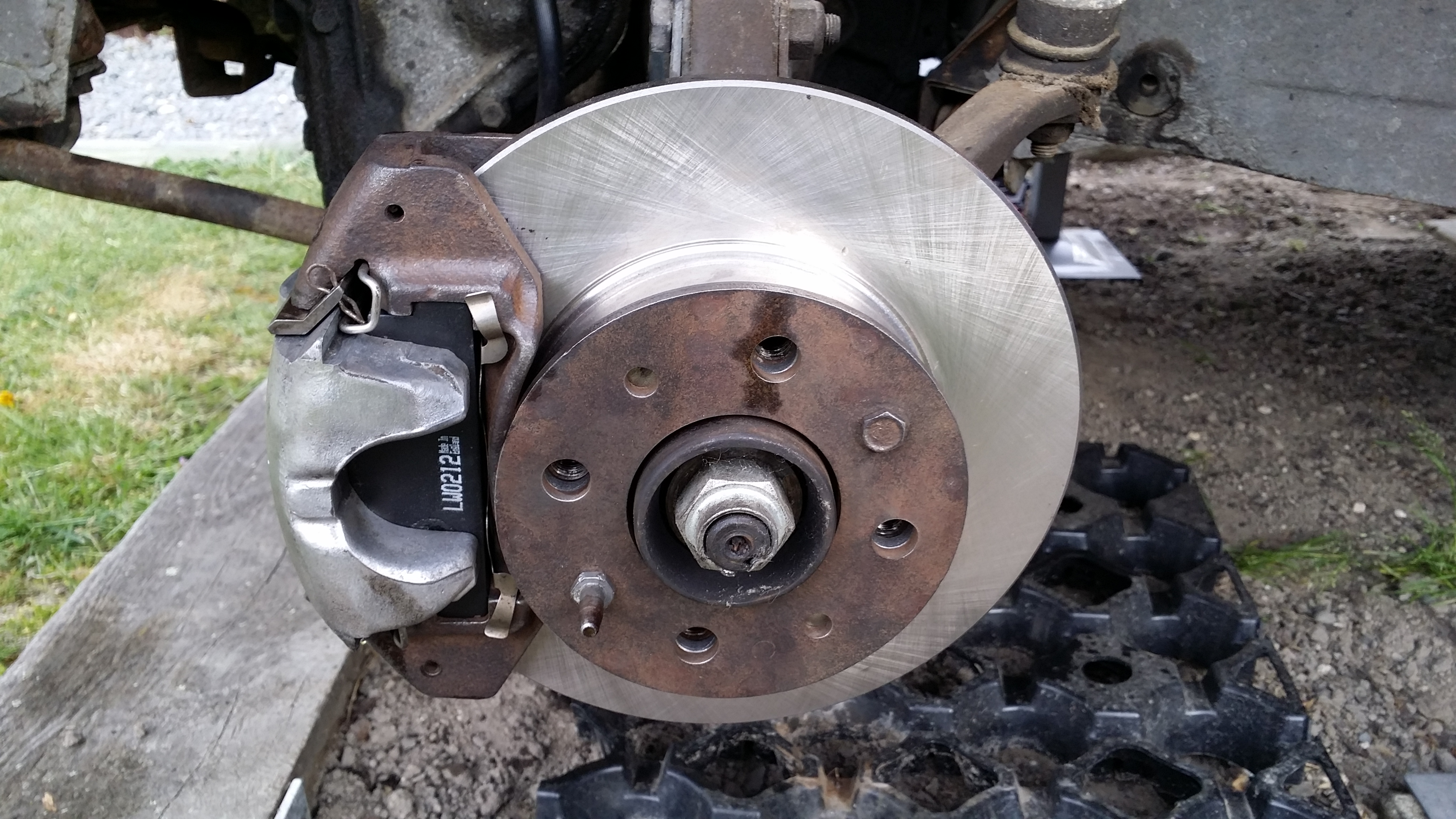
Car without wheels studs for use with lug bolts

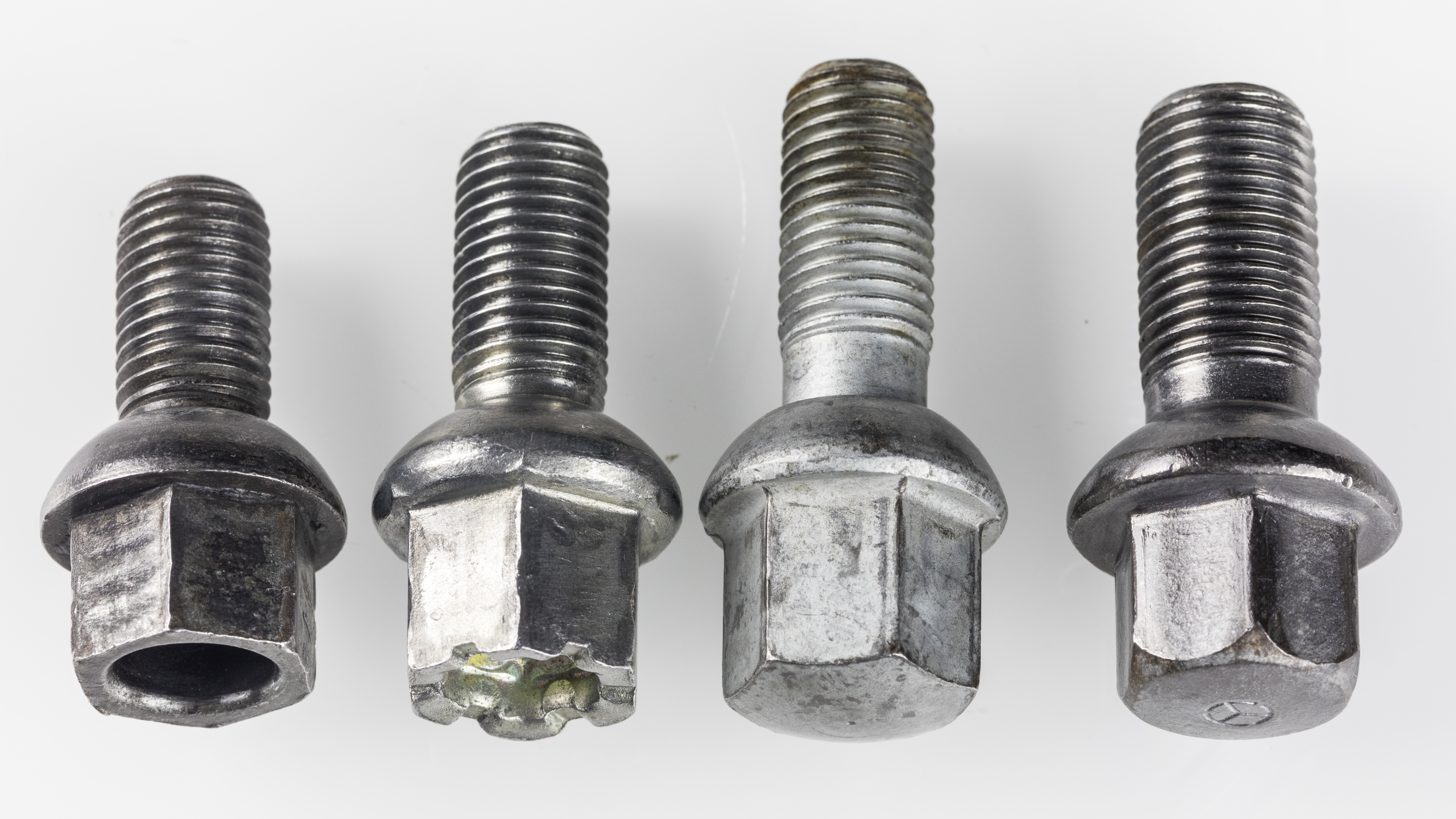
Four lug bolts, from left: Three M12×1.5 mm bolts with different length and one M14×1.5 mm bolt

== Removal and installation ==
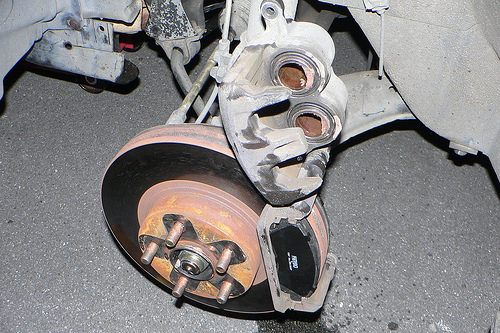
Disc brake with five wheel studs sticking out

Lug nuts may be removed using a lug wrench, socket wrench, or impact wrench. If the wheel is to be removed, an automotive jack to raise the vehicle and wheel chocks are commonly used. Wheels fitted with hubcaps or wheel covers usually require these to be removed beforehand, typically with a screwdriver, flatbar, or prybar. Lug nuts can be difficult to remove if they have corroded, seized, or been previously over-tightened. In such cases, a breaker bar or an impact wrench may be used to loosen them, although care is needed to avoid damaging the wheel stud, nut, or wheel.

Lug nuts must be installed in an alternating pattern, commonly referred to as a star pattern. This helps distribute clamping force evenly across the wheel mounting surface. When installing lug nuts, the nuts are commonly started by hand first to avoid cross-threading, then tightened gradually in stages. Final tightening should be performed with a calibrated torque wrench, not solely with an impact wrench. Disc Brakes Australia recommends following the vehicle manual, using the star pattern, and finishing to the final setting by hand with a torque wrench when impact tools are used during installation.

Torque specifications vary by vehicle, wheel design, stud size, and manufacturer. The specified value should be taken from the vehicle owner's manual or the wheel manufacturer's instructions when aftermarket wheels are fitted. Published examples show the variation between vehicles: a 2023 Toyota Corolla owner's manual specifies 76 ft-lbf (103 N-m) for the wheel nuts, while some Subaru owner's manuals specify 58 to 72 ft-lb (78 to 98 N-m). Consumer torque charts often summarize common passenger-car values at about 80 to 100 ft-lb and many trucks and SUVs at higher values, but such ranges are only general guidance and do not replace the manufacturer specification.

Incorrect torque can damage wheel studs, lug nuts, wheels, or brake rotors and drums. Under-tightened lug nuts may loosen while driving, while over-tightened lug nuts may stretch studs, damage threads, or make later removal difficult. Several owner manuals also warn against applying oil or grease to wheel studs or nuts unless specifically instructed, because lubrication can change the clamping force produced at a given torque value and may contribute to loosening or over-tightening.

After a wheel has been removed and refitted, some tire and wheel service guidance recommends rechecking the wheel nut torque after a short distance. Continental Tyres, for example, recommends retorquing after the first 30 miles or 50 kilometres following wheel or tire fitting.

The tool size needed for removal and installation depends on the type of lug nut. The three most common hex sizes for lug nuts are 17 mm, 19 mm, and 21 mm, while 22 mm, 23 mm, 11/16 inch (17.5 mm), and 13/16 inch (20.6 mm) are less commonly used.

== Detecting loose nuts ==
In order to allow early detection of loose lug nuts, some large vehicles are fitted with loose wheel nut indicators. The indicator spins with the nut so that loosening can be detected with a visual inspection.

== Anti-theft nuts or bolts ==
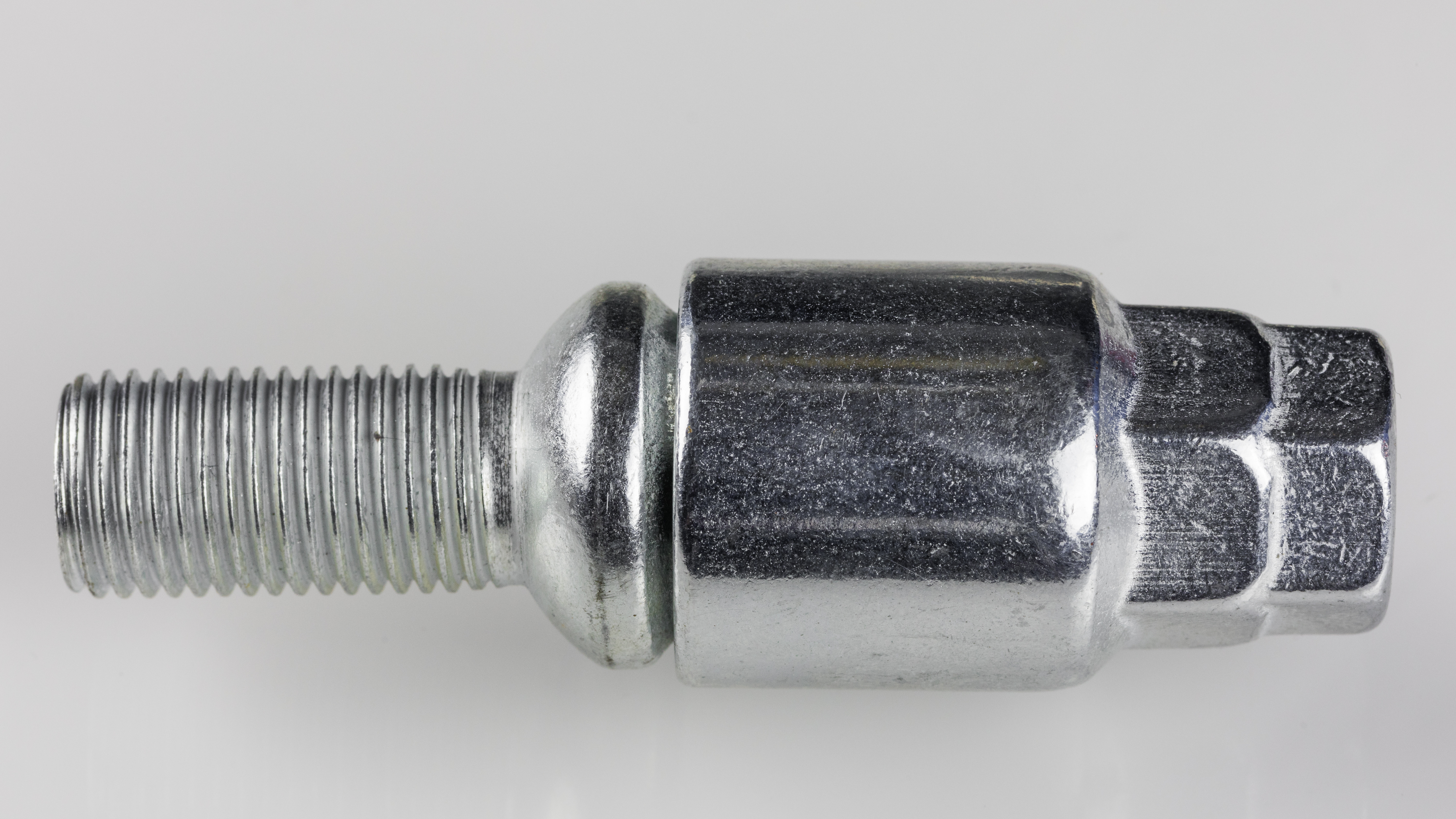
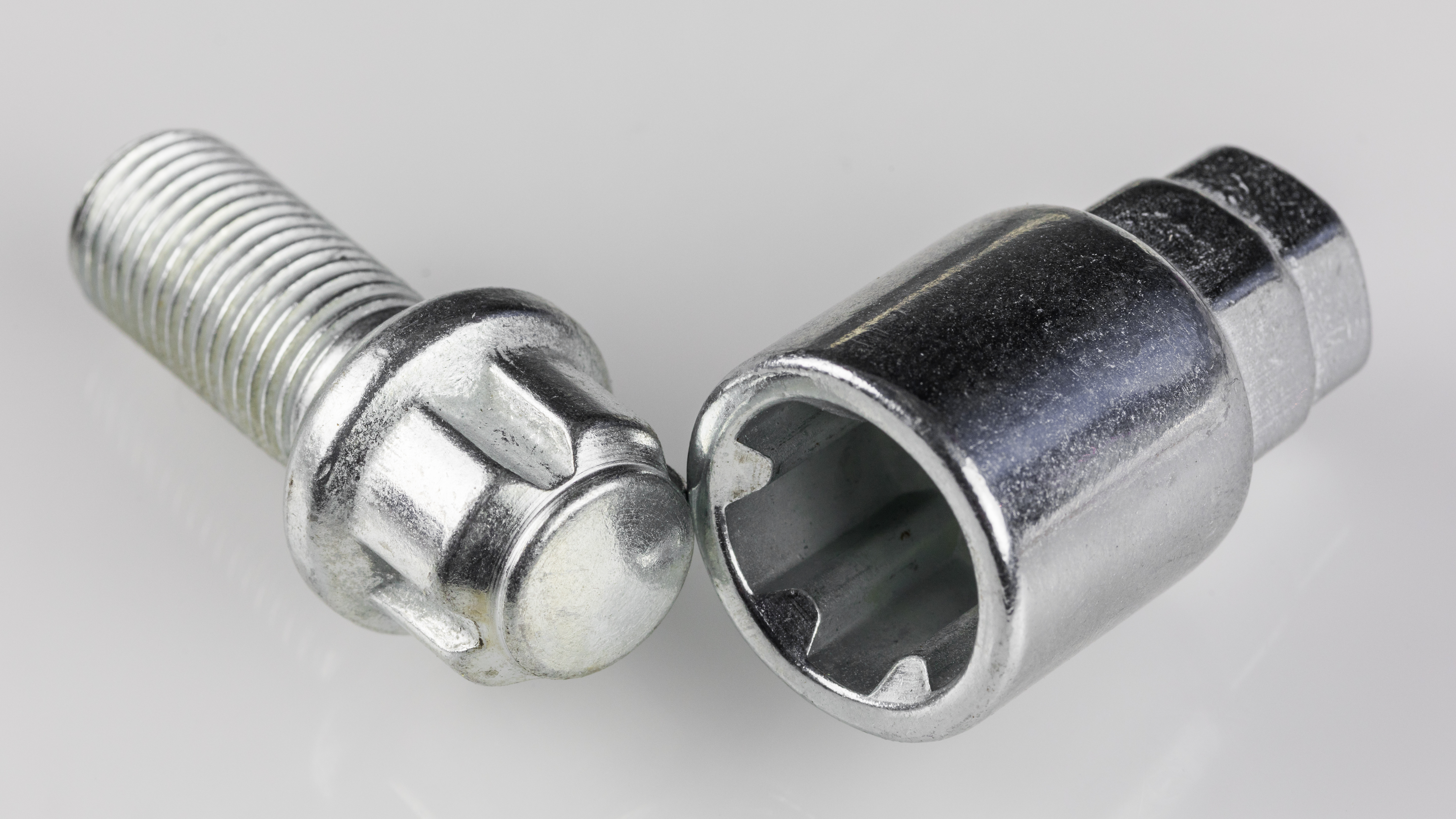
Spherical wheel lock bolt and associated key, the latter with stepped 17 mm and 19 mm AF hex drive

In countries where the theft of alloy wheels is a serious problem, locking nuts (or bolts, as applicable) are available — or already fitted by the vehicle manufacturer — which require a special adaptor ("key") between the nut and the wrench to fit and remove. The key is normally unique to each set of nuts. Only one locking nut per wheel is normally used, so they are sold in sets of four. Most designs can be defeated using a hardened removal tool which uses a left-hand self-cutting thread to grip the locking nut, although more advanced designs have a spinning outer ring to frustrate such techniques. An older technique for removal was to simply hammer a slightly smaller socket over the locking wheel nut to be able to remove it. However, with the newer design of locking wheel nuts this is no longer possible. Removal nowadays requires special equipment that is not available to the general public. This helps to prevent thieves from obtaining the tools to be able to remove the lock nuts themselves.

== History ==
In the United States, vehicles manufactured prior to 1975 by the Chrysler Corporation used left-hand and right-hand screw thread for different sides of the vehicle to prevent loosening. Most Buicks, Pontiacs, and Oldsmobiles used both left-handed and right-handed lug nuts prior to model year 1965. It was later realized that the taper seat performed the same function. Most modern vehicles use right-hand threads on all wheels.

== See also ==
- Center cap
- Wheel sizing
