= Hubcap =

Decorative disk on an automobile wheel

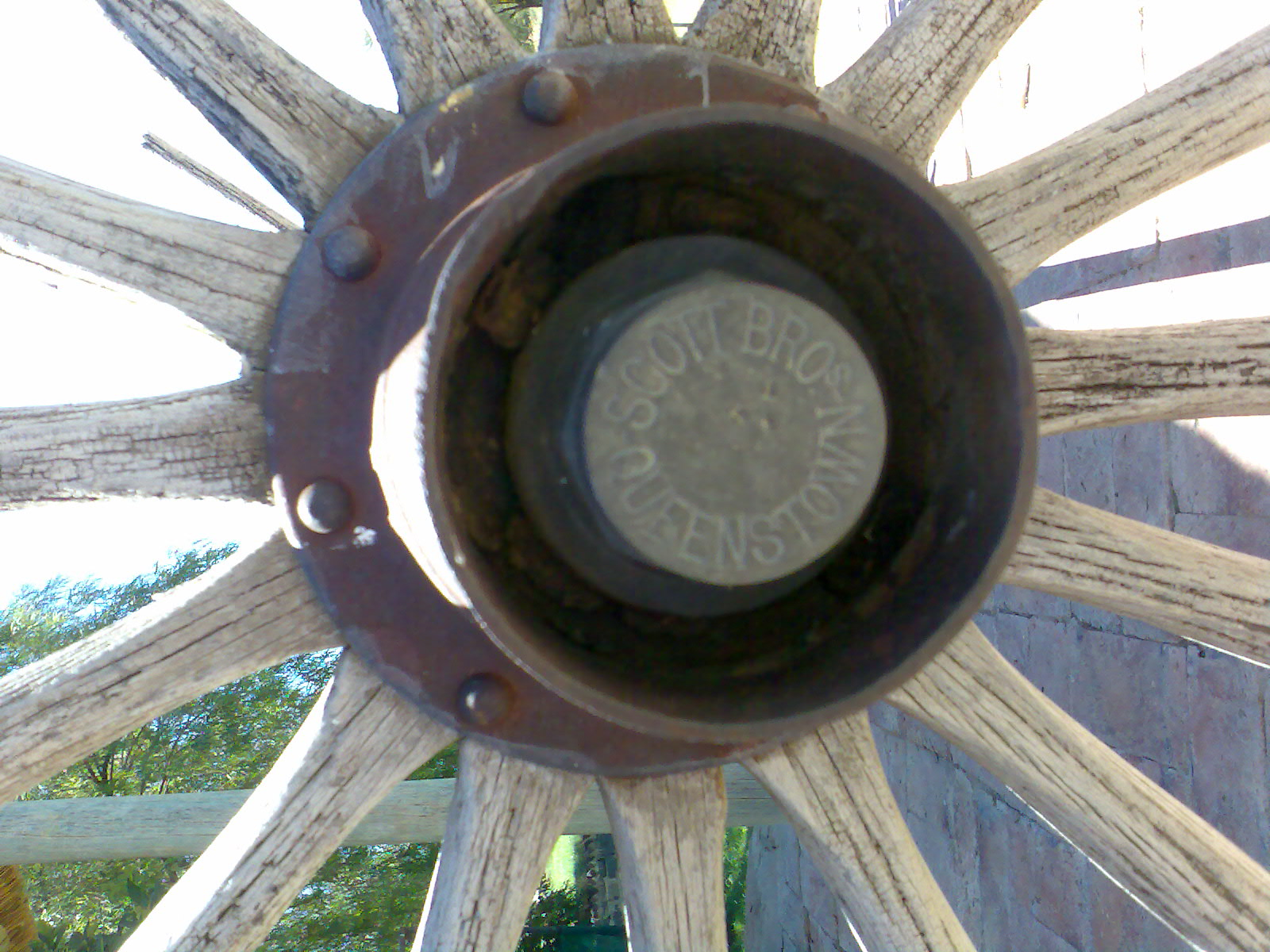
A threaded brass hubcap on a cart wheel with artillery style hub

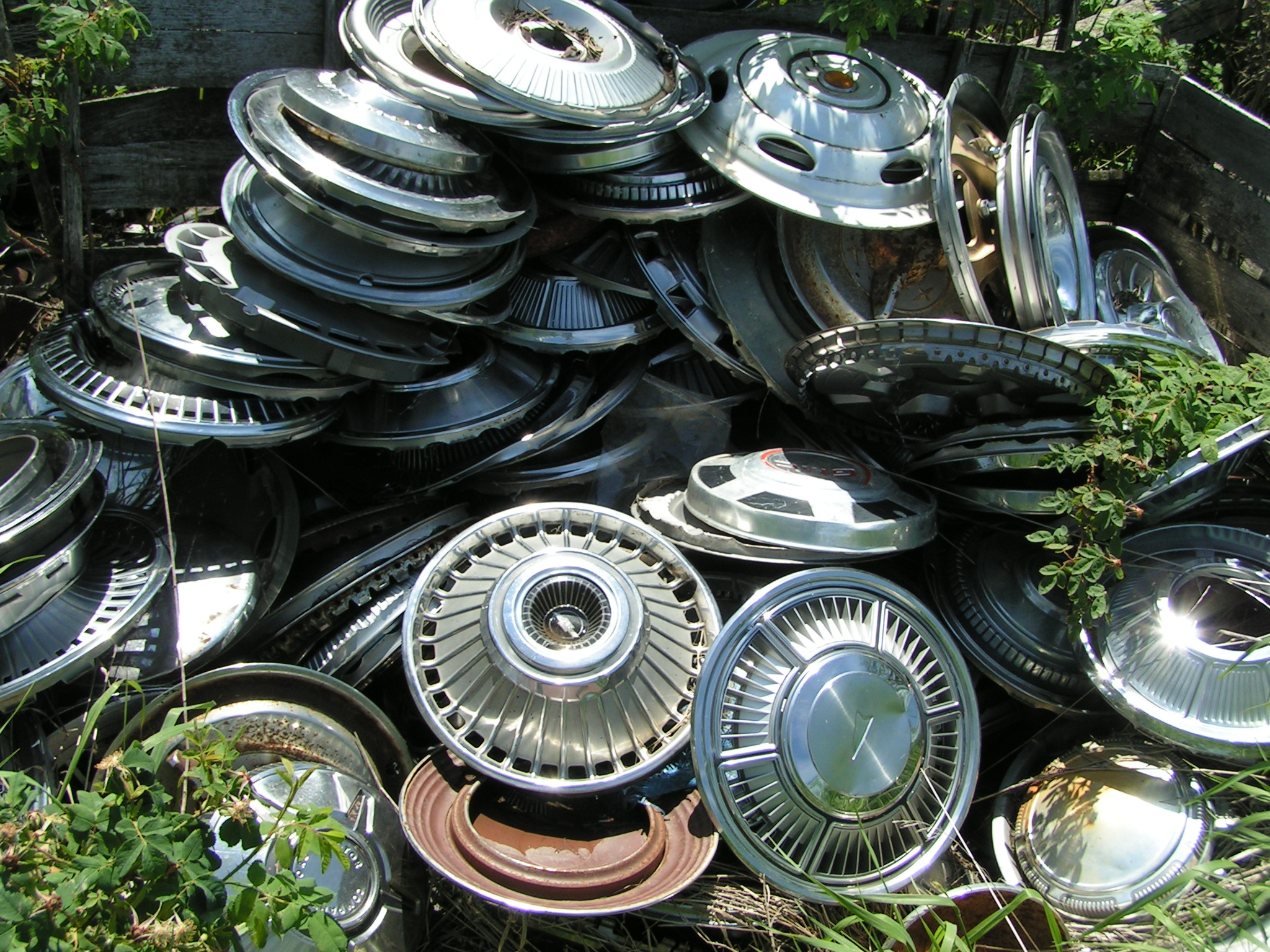
Various automobile hubcaps

A hubcap or hub cap is a decorative disk on an automobile wheel that covers at minimum the central portion of the wheel, called the hub. An automobile hubcap covers the wheel hub and the lug nuts to reduce the accumulation of dirt and moisture. It also decorates the car.

A hubcap is technically a small cover over the center of the wheel, while a wheel cover is a decorative metal or plastic disk that snaps or bolts onto and covers the entire face of the wheel.

Cars with stamped steel wheels often use a full-wheel cover that conceals the entire wheel. Cars with alloy wheels or styled steel wheels do not cover the wheels with wheel covers and do not cover the lug nuts with hubcaps; they cover the central access hole with small center caps (sometimes also called hubcaps).

Alternatively, a wheel cover or spare tire cover can be an accessory that covers an external rear-mounted spare tire found on some automobiles.

== History ==
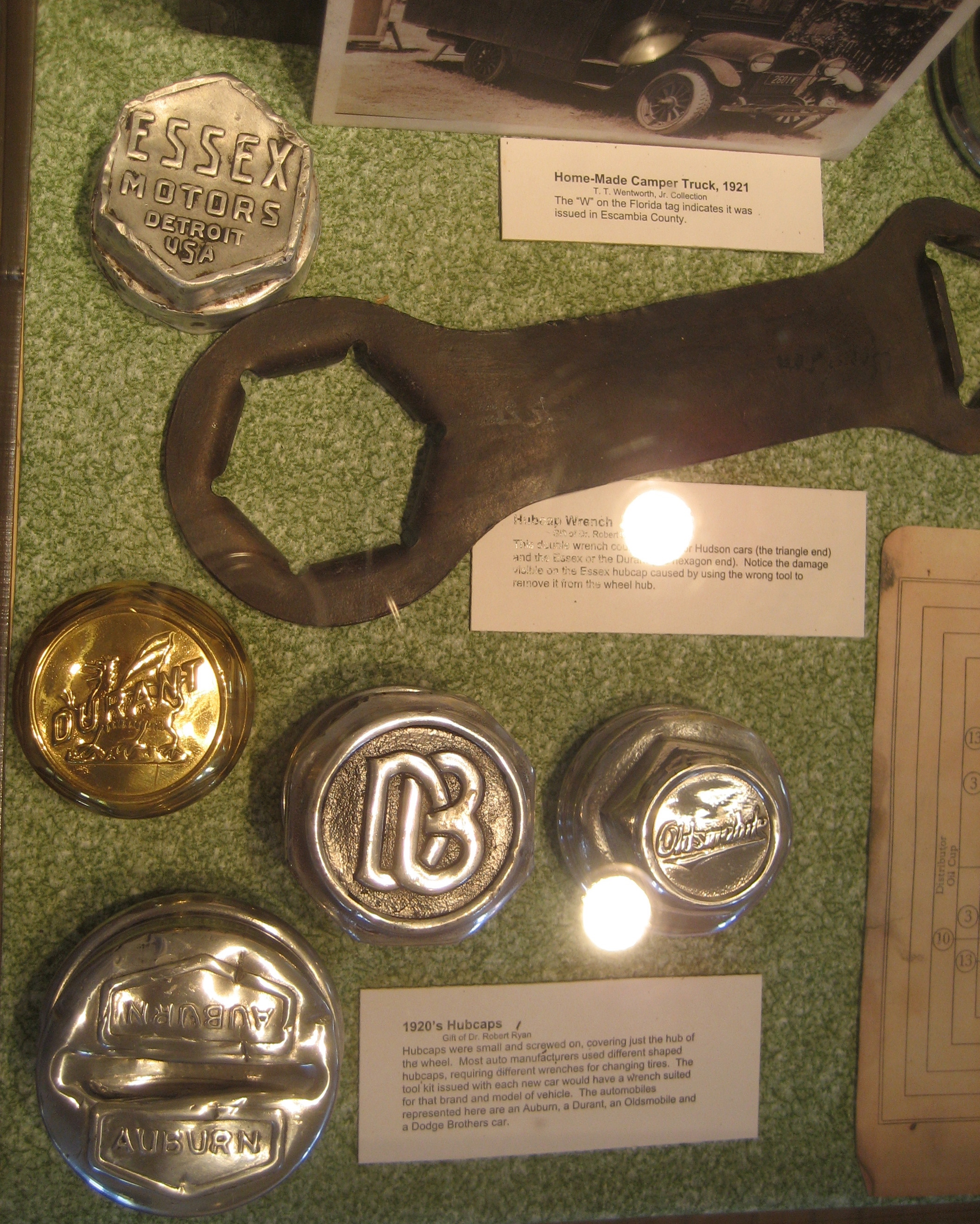
Display of 1920s automobile hubcaps and a removal tool

Hubcaps were first used on the Newton Reaction Carriage in 1680. The first hubcaps were more commonly known as dust or grease caps. These caps are threaded onto the center hub on the wood, steel, or wire wheel. These were made from the beginning of car manufacturing to 1932. Pre-1915 hubcaps were all mostly made of brass that was nickel-plated. The 1920s hubcaps were mostly aluminum. Grease caps of the wire wheel brands such as Houk, Hayes, Frayer, Dayton, Buffalo, House, Phelps, Pasco, Rudge Whitworth, Budd, and Stewart are some of the hardest to find. When a customer went to buy the wire wheels, the make of the vehicle would be stamped in the center. During 1927 and 1928, the first snap-on center caps were being made on the wire wheels. After 1932, almost every car had a snap-on style center cap on the middle of their wire, steel, or wood wheels. Wire wheel center caps in the 1930s had a spring-loaded retention clip system that has been used on many hubcaps and center caps on every style of car and truck to the present day.

Steel wheels in the 1930s had retention clips mounted to the wheel that snapped into a lip in the back of the cap. Wood wheels were a special option. The caps on these had a large chrome base that mushroomed up to another smaller chrome base that would have the emblem on the face. The "stem" up to the second base was usually painted black to make it look as if the top base was floating. These caps were usually made of brass, steel, or aluminum. During the mid-1930s the first full wheel covers were introduced to fit over the entire wheel, except for a small portion of the rim closest to the rubber tire.

Cord and Hudson were the early adopters. Cord made a plain chrome wheel cover that had a smooth top and holes in the side. The Hudson wheel cover was flat with a lip halfway to the middle and the center would say "Hudson", "Hudson Eight", or "Terraplane". This configuration differs from the "knock-off" spinners found on some racing cars and cars equipped with true wire wheels. While the knock-off spinner resembles an early hubcap, its threads also retain the wheel itself, in lieu of lug nuts.

When pressed steel wheels became common by the 1940s, these were often painted the same color as the car body. Hubcaps expanded in size to cover the lug nuts that were used to mount these steel wheels. They then serve to protect the lug nuts or wheel bolts from rust and corrosion that could make them hard to remove when it was necessary to change the wheel to repair a tire.

An option on some cars was a chrome-plated trim ring that clipped onto the outer rim of the wheel, in addition to the center hubcap. The full wheel cover became popular that covered the entire wheel. These became increasingly decorative in style and were typically made from chrome-plated or stainless steel. Basic automobiles came standard with simple, unadorned, and inexpensive hubcaps called "poverty caps" or "dog dish caps" due to their size and shape. Various optional full wheel covers of various designs were optional or were standard equipment on higher trim models. Metal hubcaps also offer an audible warning should a wheel nut work its way off. During the 1960s and 1970s, automakers also offered stainless steel spoke full wheel covers that simulated the look of traditional, and more costly, wire-spoke wheels.

Specialty wheels of magnesium or aluminum alloy had come onto the market, and wheel covers were a cheap means of imitating their styling. Plastic wheel covers (known in the UK as wheel trims) appeared in the 1970s and became mainstream in the 1980s. The first domestic automobile to use a full plastic wheel cover was the Chevy Monza which featured a "wind blade" design and came in several colors.

The variety and number of hubcaps available as original equipment have increased. Plastic has now largely replaced steel as the primary material for manufacturing hubcaps and trims, and where steel wheels are still used, the wheels are now generally painted black so the wheel is less visible through cutouts in the wheel trim. On modern automobiles, full-wheel hubcaps are most commonly seen on budget models and base trim levels, while upscale and performance-oriented models use alloy wheels. Even modern aluminum alloy wheels generally use small removable center caps, similar in size to the earliest hubcaps. The variety of wheel trims on any particular car has expanded significantly, for example, a 2003 BMW Z3 had 23 different wheel options.

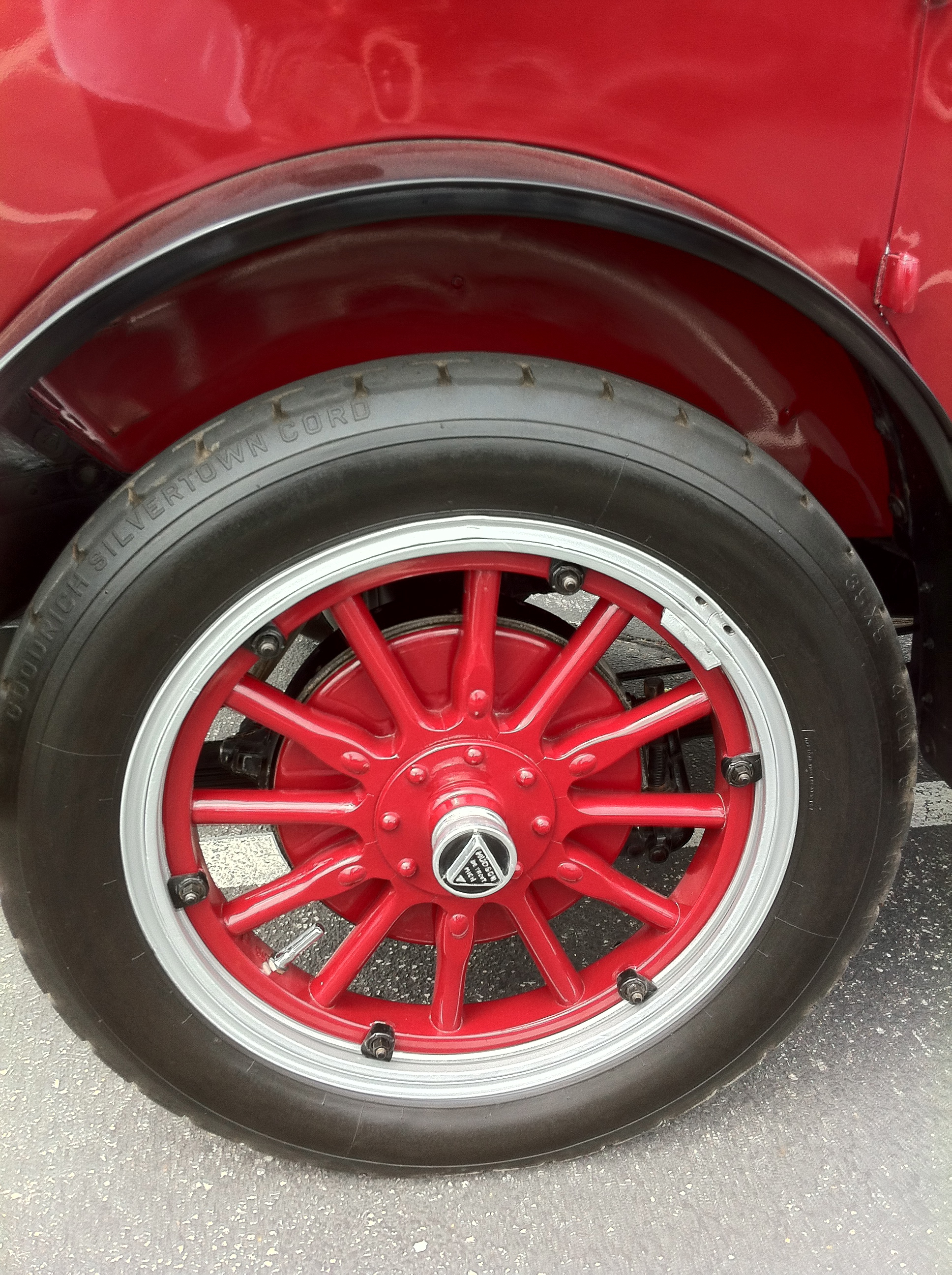
Center small hubcap with automaker's logo

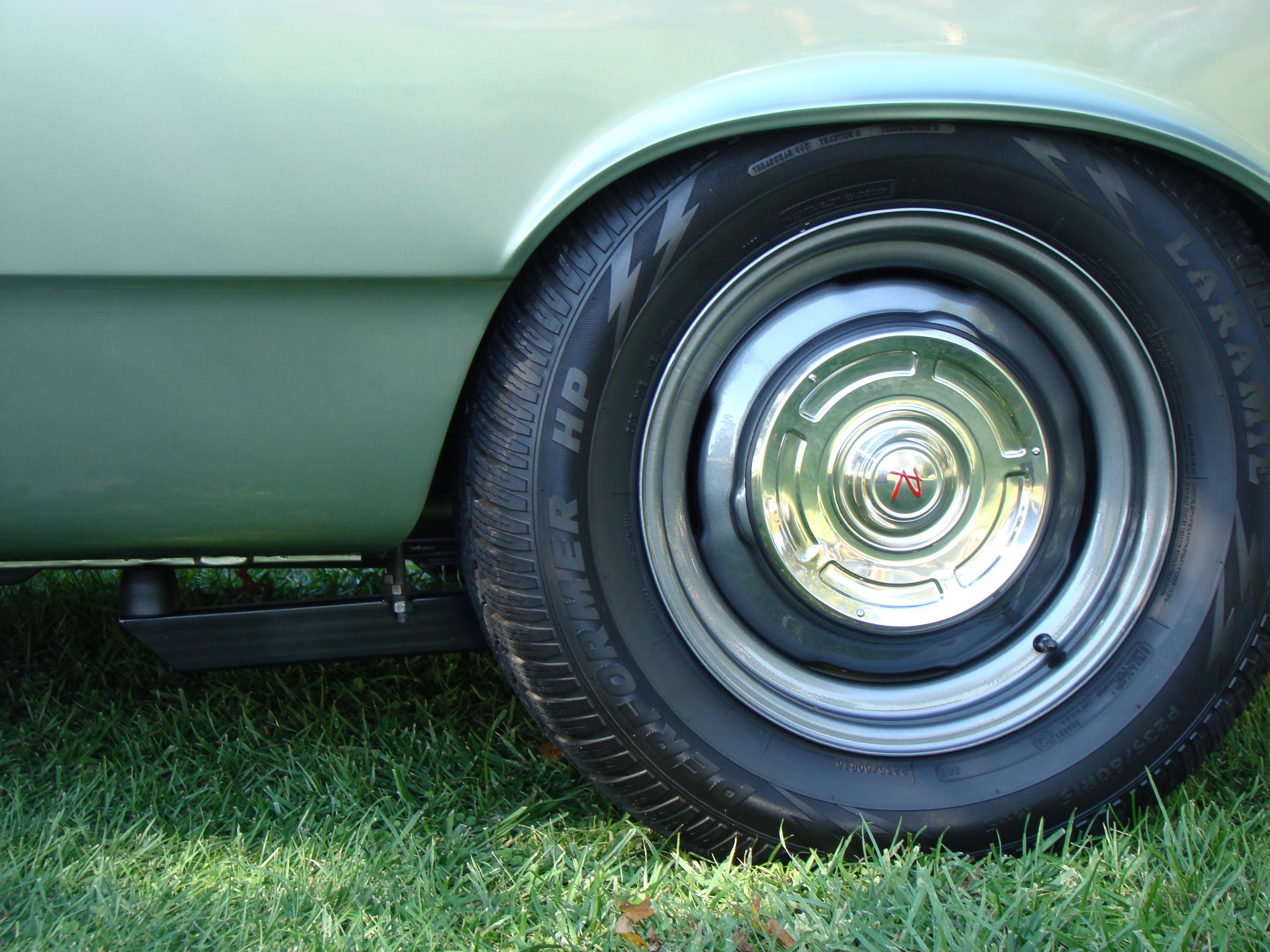
"Dog dish" cap on a painted steel wheel

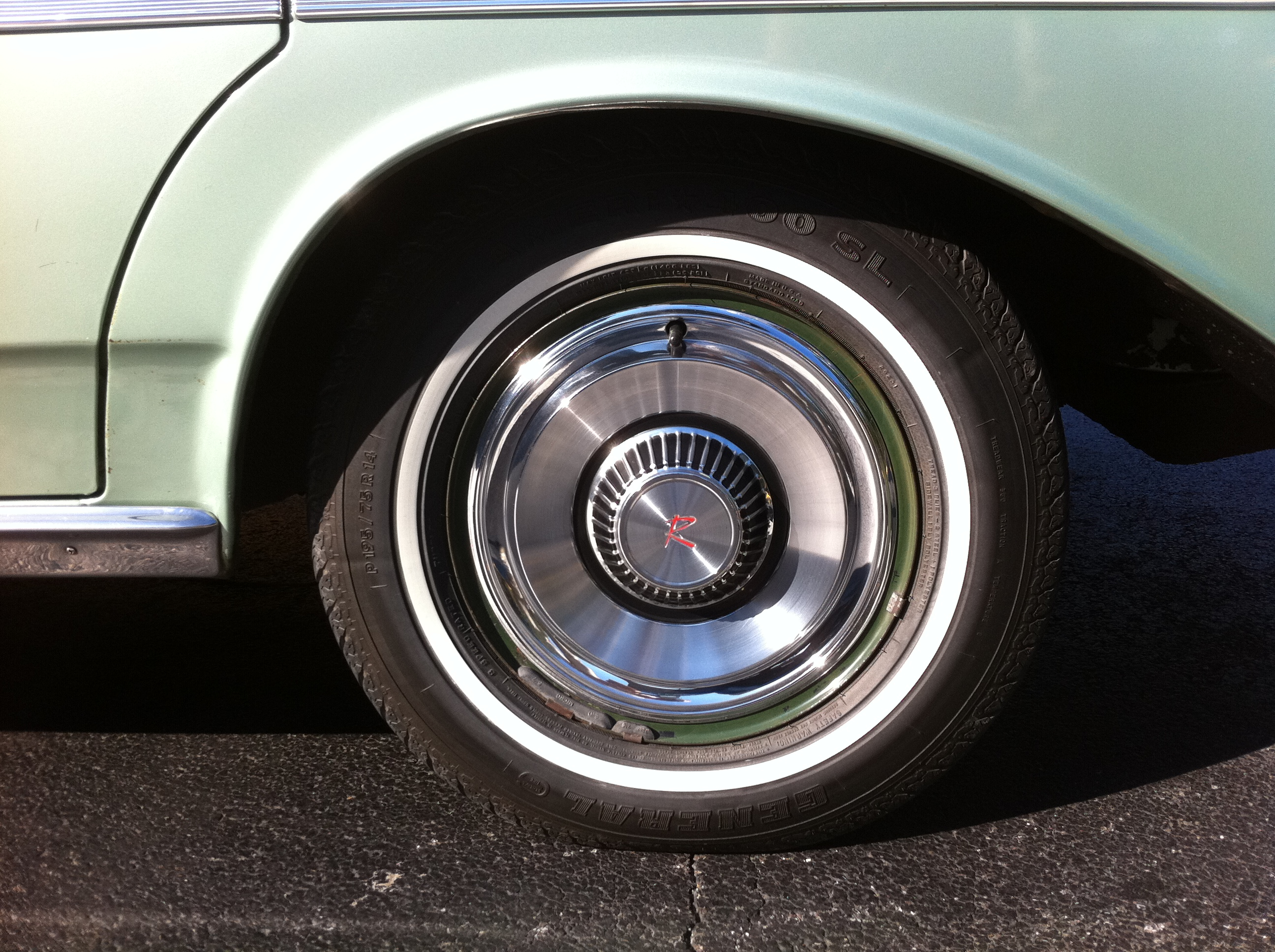
Stainless steel wheel cover

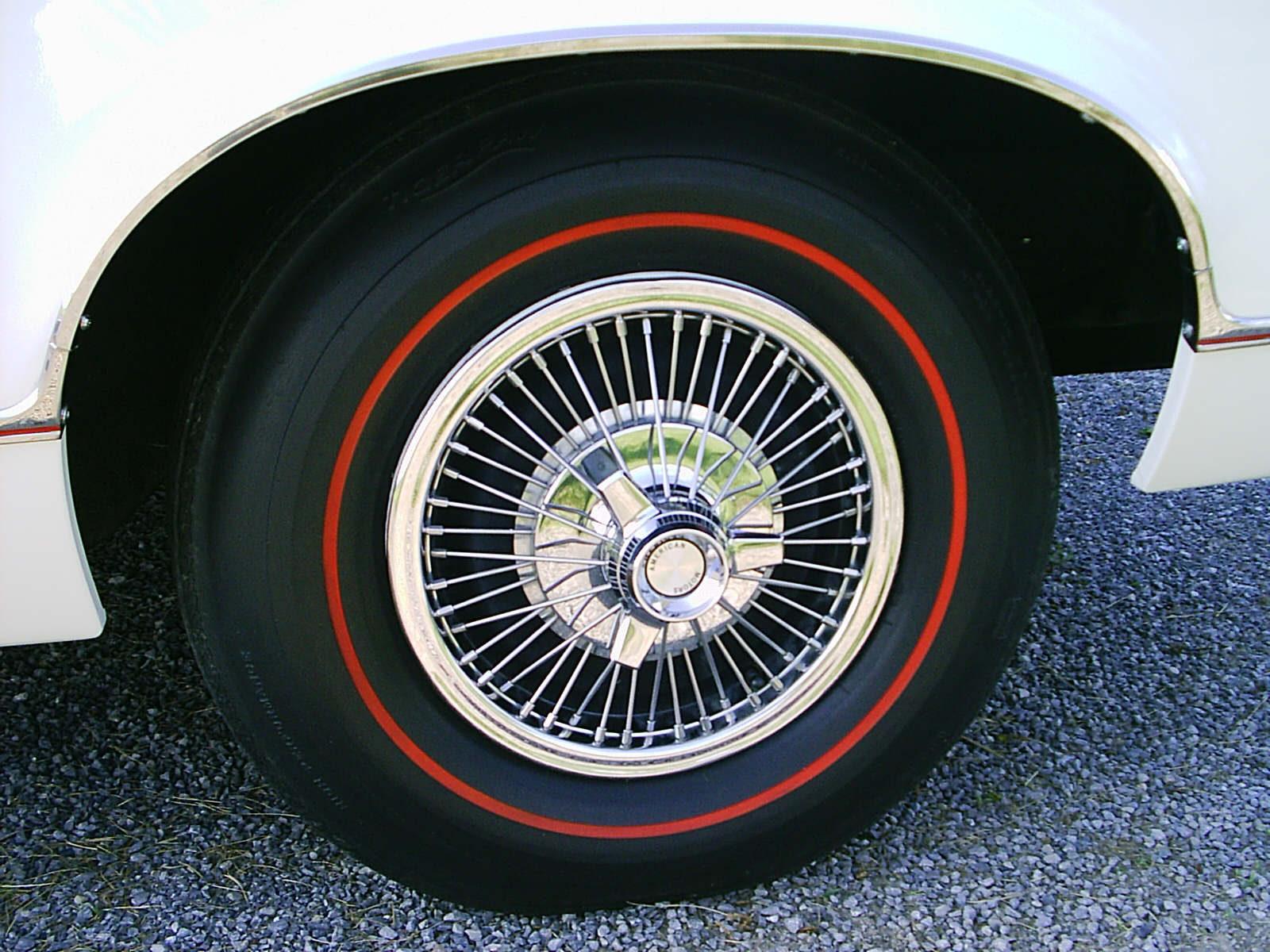
Simulated "wire wheel" cover with spinner ornament

== Characteristics and design ==
Often a hubcap will bear the trademark or symbol of the maker of the automobile or the maker of the hubcap. Early hubcaps were often chrome-plated, and many had decorative, non-functional spokes. Hubcaps were immortalized in the Art Deco styling near the top of one rung of setbacks (ornamental frieze) incorporates a band of hubcaps on the Chrysler Building in midtown Manhattan.

Part of the lore of hubcaps is that on bad roads they have a tendency of falling off due to hitting a bump. Center caps, however, fall off less frequently than older full wheel covers, which were often quite heavy. In some parts of the U.S. and in Mexico there are automotive garages whose walls were decorated with various hubcaps that had fallen off in the vicinity; they were often for sale.

This problem persists even with different retention systems that have been engineered. Hubcaps generally use either clip-on retention, where some type of spring steel clip (or plastic clip in the case of plastic hubcaps) engages a groove in the wheel, or bolt-on retention, where a threaded fastener retains the hubcap, or a plastic washer attached to the lugnut itself holds the hubcap on. Clip-on hubcaps tend to pop off suddenly when the wheel impacts a pothole or curbstone, while bolt-on hubcaps are more likely to vibrate loose over time, and tend to rattle and squeak.

To prevent the loss, owners attach plastic wheel trims to the wheel itself using an electrical zip tie, which are sold in silver color for this purpose. A kit consisting of spare zip ties, a pair of cutting pliers, and latex gloves allow a trim thus secured to be removed easily in the event of a tire puncture.

In the U.S., during the age of custom cars (the 1950s–early 1960s), decorating one's car with the wheel covers from another was common. Two very desirable wheel covers were those of the 1950 Cadillac (called the "Sombrero") and that of the 1953 to 1955 Oldsmobile, which resembled a huge, three-tined spinner. Aftermarket suppliers included the "Mooneyes" brand (named after the firm's founder Dean Moon) hubcaps and wheel covers that were some of the first independently offered for hot rods and custom cars.

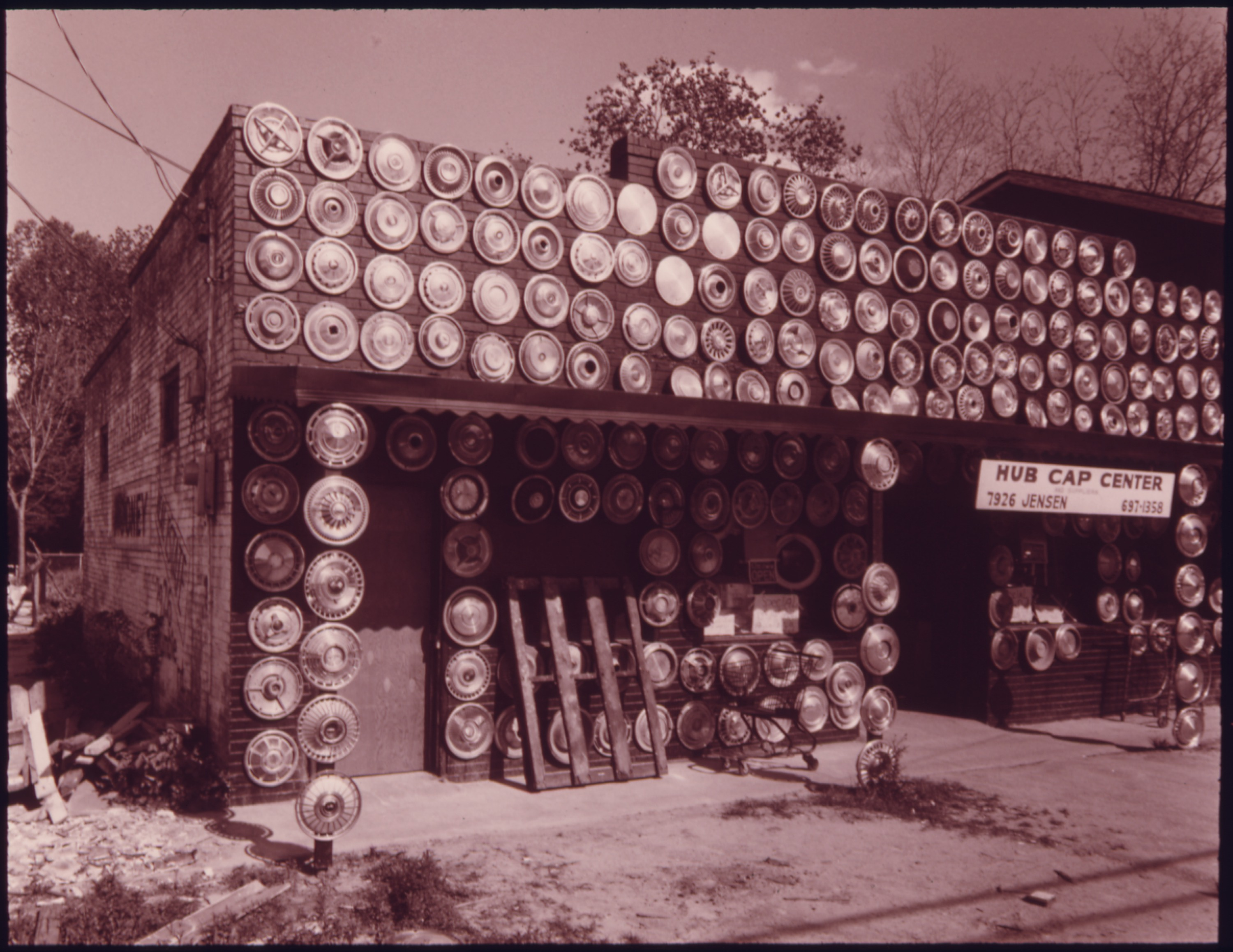
"Hub Cap Center" in Texas

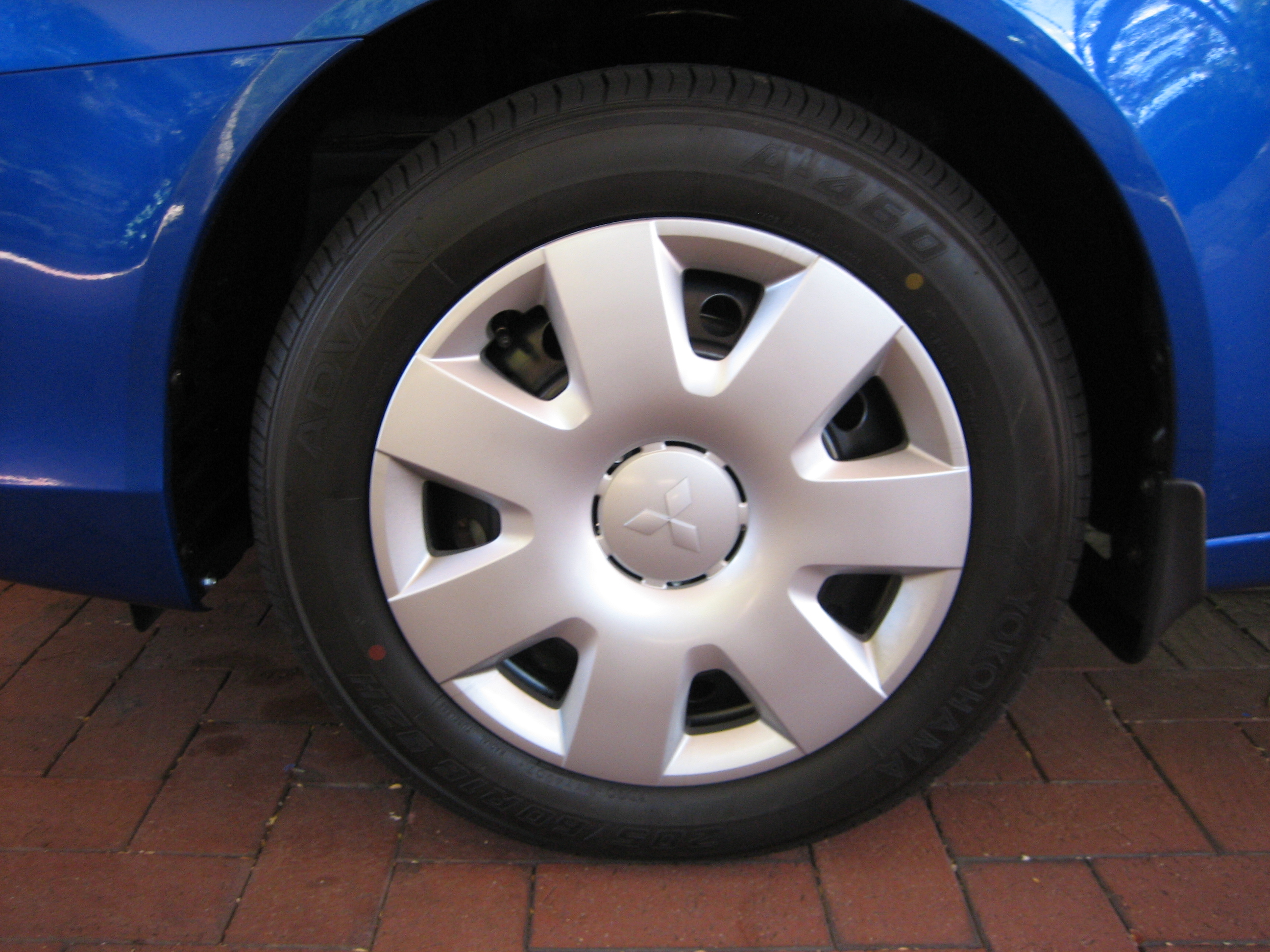
Plastic hubcap covering a steel wheel bears the automaker's logo

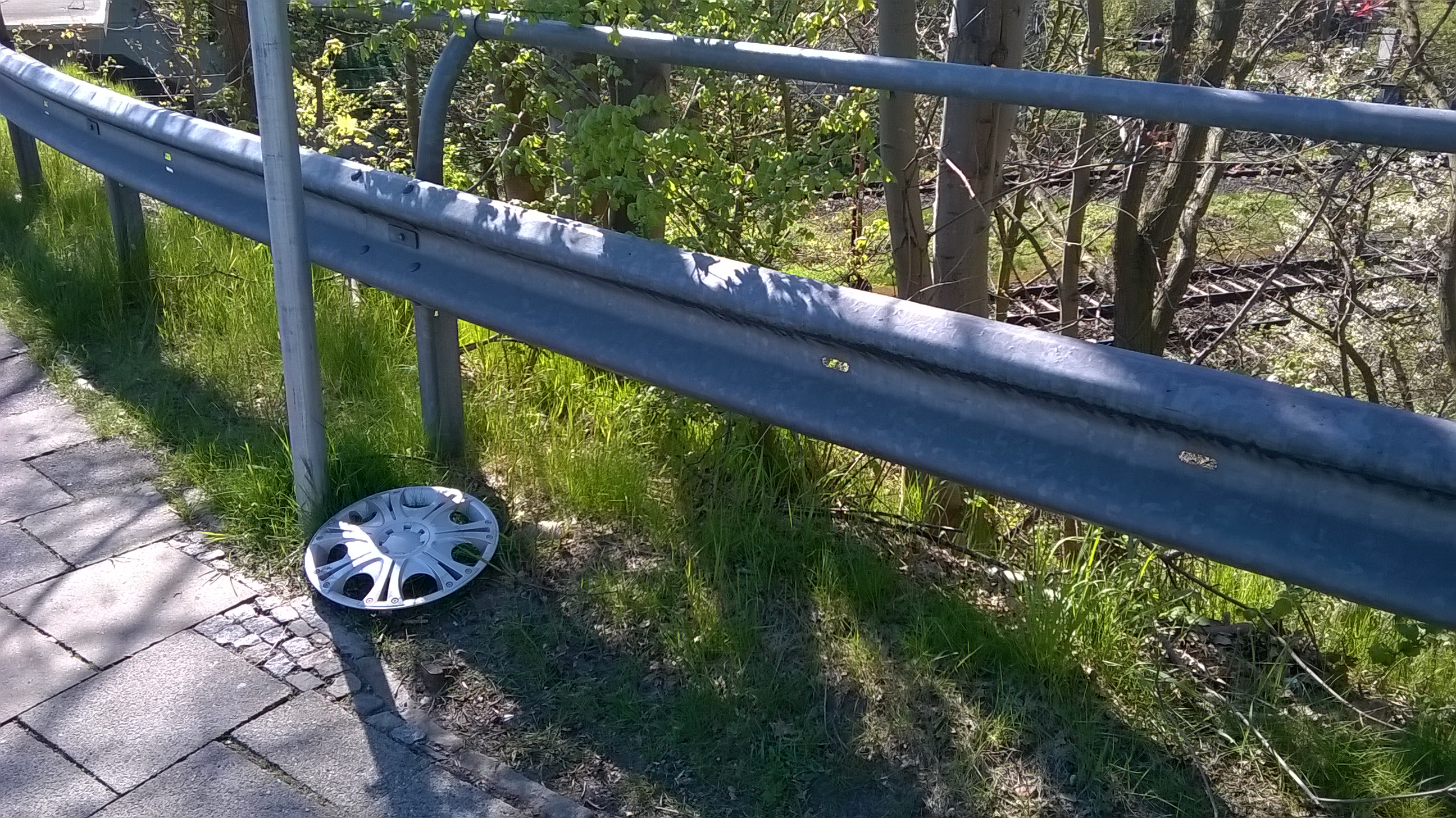
A lost plastic wheel cover next to a road

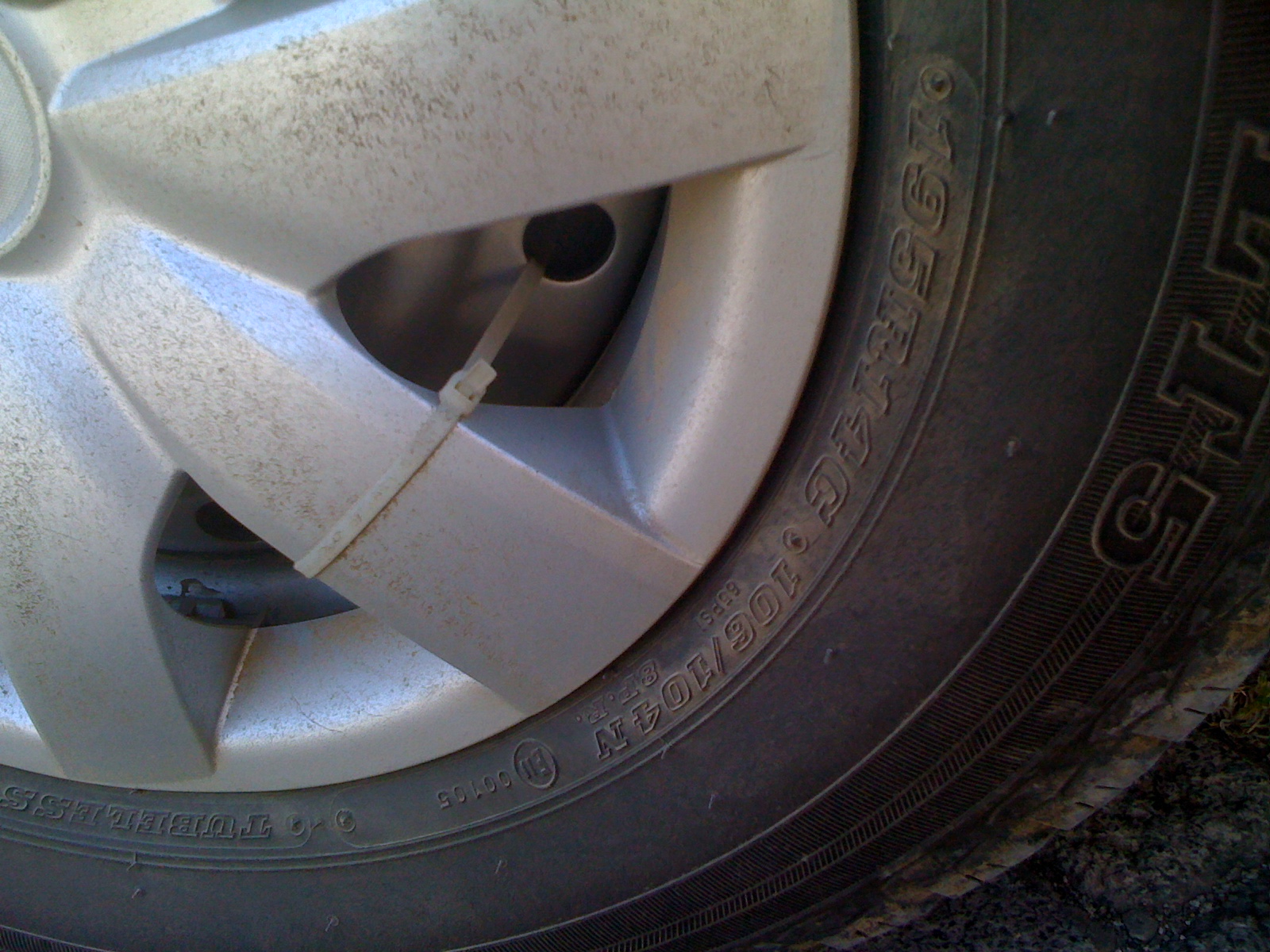
Cable tie to help prevent accidental detachment

=== Motorsport use ===
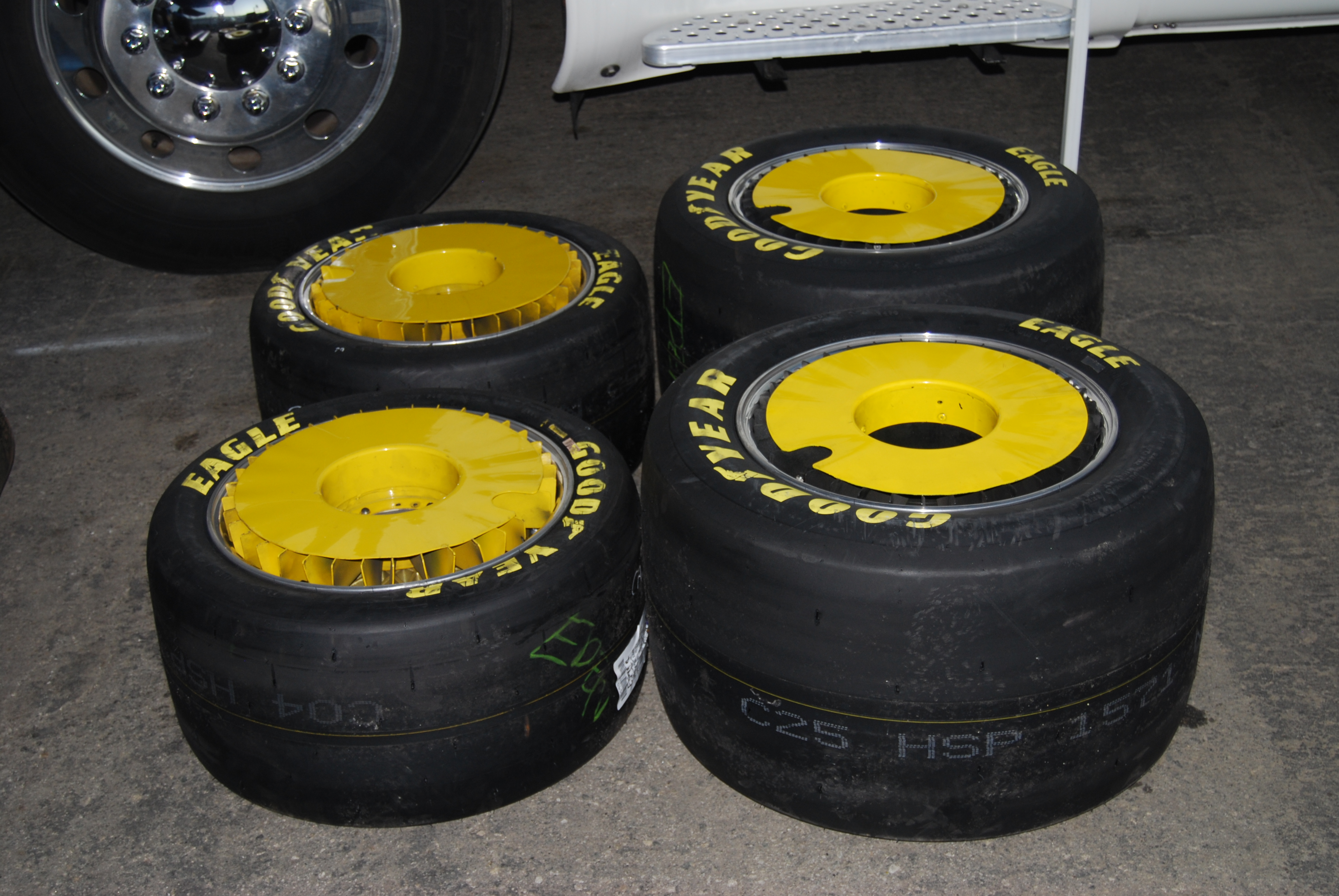
1980s BBS racing wheel shroud

Another variant of the wheel cover, known also as wheel shrouds, rim blanking or turbofans, is associated with the German wheelmaking brand BBS since the 1970s. These are attached to the wheel first, then bolted on as if the driver or mechanic is bolting the wheel to his car in the manner of changing their wheel. Commonly made from aluminum, they are designed to distribute airflow to the brakes, thereby generating downforce depending on the shape. Thus, these wheel covers are functional rather than merely decorative.

From 2006, to get around FIA technical regulations that all wheels must be made from an homogeneous metallic material, a carbon fiber variant found its way into Formula One when it was used by Scuderia Ferrari whom BBS supply its wheels to. At the Turkish Grand Prix, the rear shrouds were also adopted by Toyota and Toro Rosso and thus their use became widespread for all teams. Prior to being banned from the 1994 PPG Indy Car World Series, wheel shrouds were popular on superspeedways until Team Penske revealed that those covers could reduce drag by 2.5%.

Another type of wheel cover, the static wheel fairing, was introduced by BBS for Ferrari at the British Grand Prix to act as a brake cooling aid for front wheels while remaining stationary the wheel itself with one part being cut out at a 27° angle to enable hot air to escape and thus became adopted by every team. The wheel covers were banned from use in F1 from the 2010 season after incidents where they broke loose in races. To get around the ban, Ferrari used a detachable integral aero device made from the same magnesium material as the wheel itself, which consisted of double concentric rings of different diameters. As parts of cars now have to be homologated, its rivals were unable to copy this device. Its use became eliminated when the FIA revised the regulations for 2011 season to prohibit wheel materials in certain exclusion zones.

=== Non-rotating hubcap ===
A non-rotating hubcap retains the same orientation even when a vehicle is in motion. An example is the Rolls-Royce whose hubcap centers are weighted and mounted to revolve independently of the wheel rotation, thus the RR logo can be read while the vehicle is in motion.

This design also allows for messages or advertising to be placed on the hubcap and be read while the vehicle is moving. Non-rotating hubcaps with advertisements may be found on race cars, taxis, commercial vehicles, industrial machinery, buses, and golf carts.

== Nave plate ==
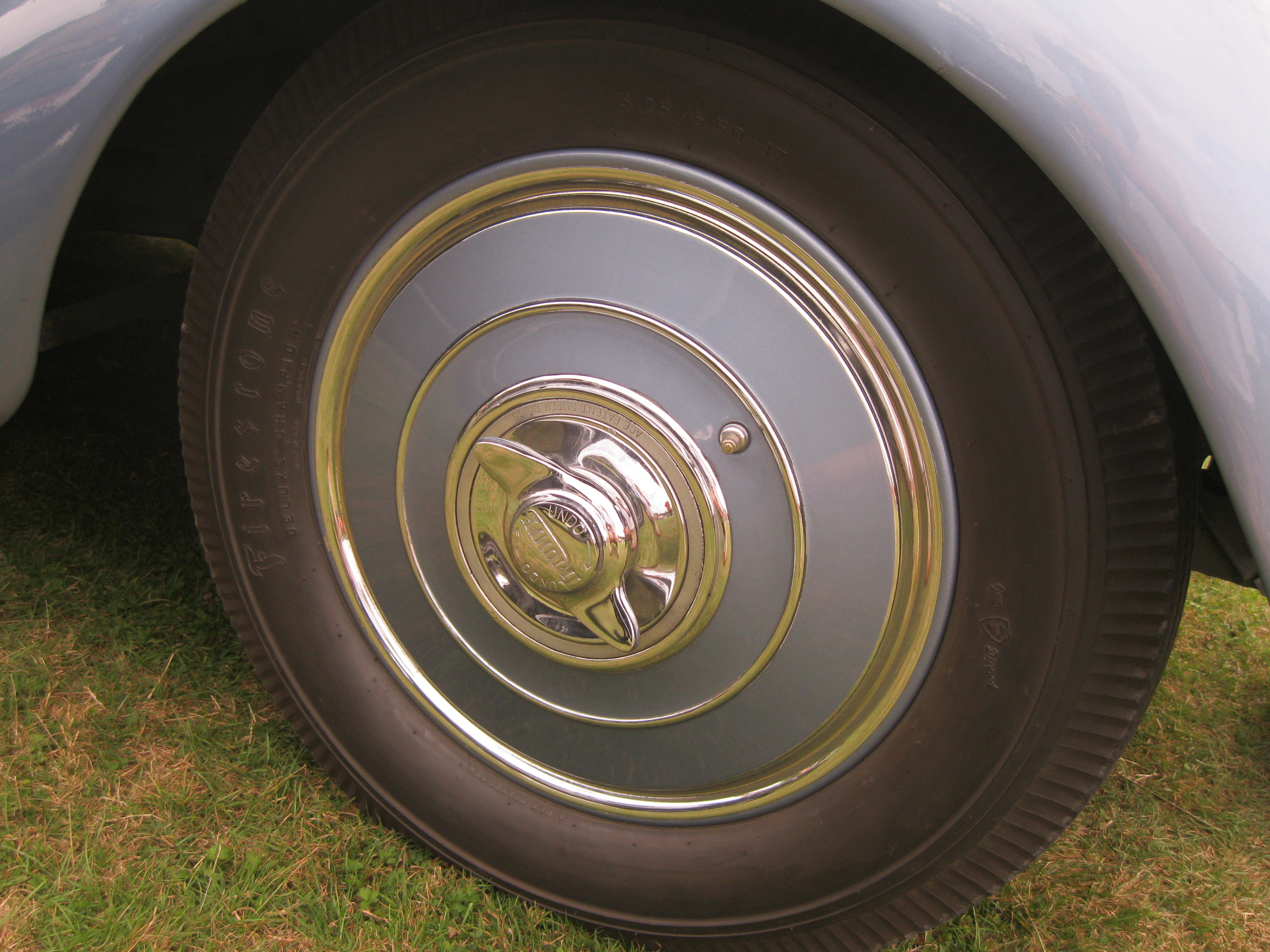
Nave plate on a 1940 Triumph Dolomite

A nave plate is a British name for a hubcap. These chromed disks were decorative embellishments on British cars, such as those made by Triumph.

These plates can also cover the entire wheel. Nave plates were used in the 1920s and 1930s to cover wire wheels (which are lighter and truer running than more conventional pressed steel wheels) to make them appear modern and streamlined as well as to make it easier to keep them clean.

== See also ==
- Center cap
- List of auto parts
