= Alloy wheel =

Wheel made from an alloy of aluminium or magnesium

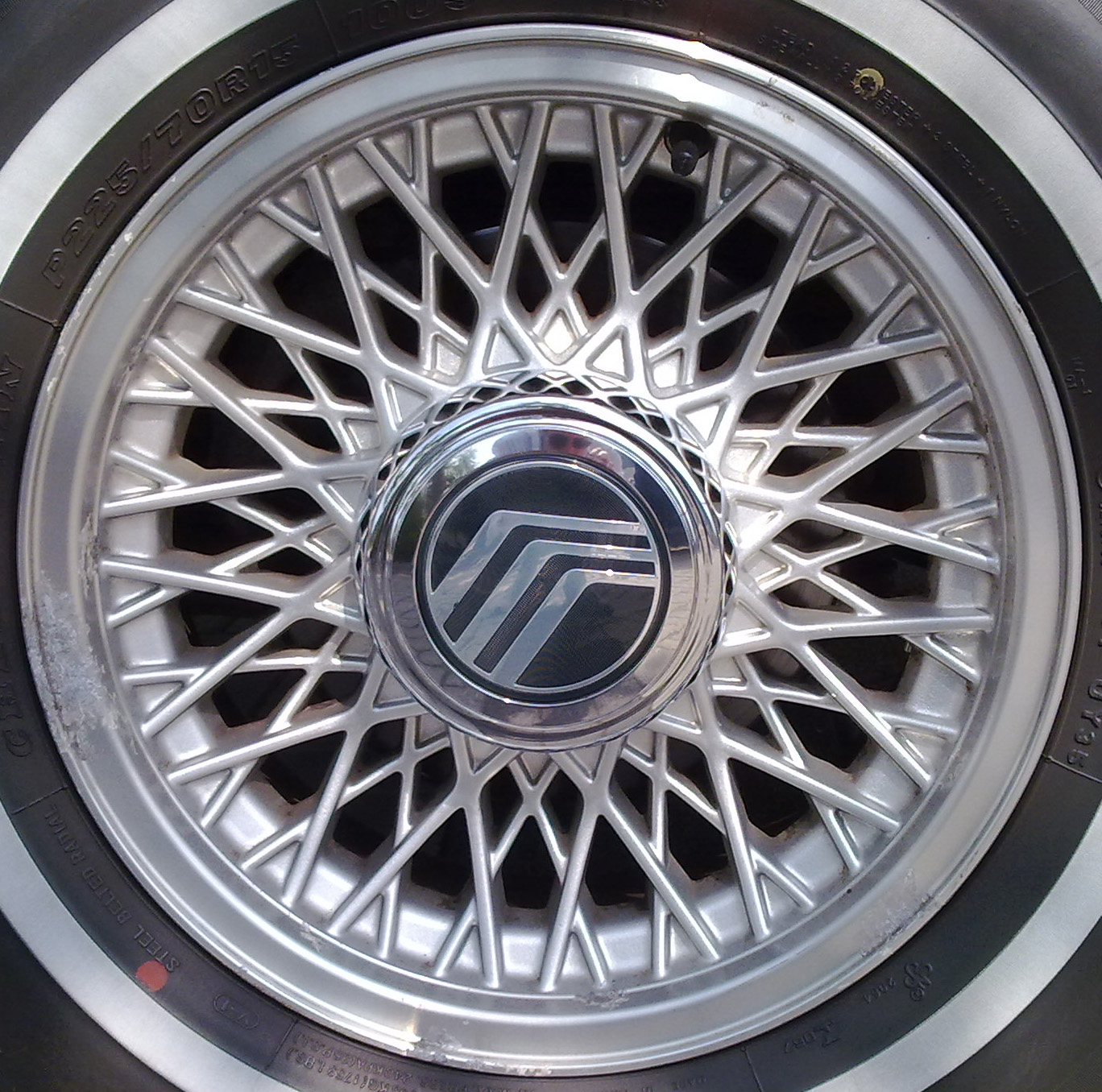
Alloy wheel on a Mercury Grand Marquis

In the automotive industry, alloy wheels are wheels (rims) that are made from an alloy of aluminium or magnesium. Alloys are mixtures of a metal and other elements. They generally provide greater strength over pure metals, which are usually much softer and more ductile. Alloys of aluminium or magnesium are typically lighter for the same strength, provide better heat conduction, and often produce improved cosmetic appearance over steel wheels. Although steel, (the most common material used in wheel production), is an alloy of iron and carbon, the term "alloy wheel" is usually reserved for wheels made from nonferrous alloys.

The earliest light-alloy wheels were made of magnesium alloys. Although they lost favor on common vehicles, they remained popular through the 1960s, albeit in very limited numbers. In the mid-to-late 1960s, aluminium-casting refinements allowed the manufacture of safer wheels that were not as brittle. Until this time, most aluminium wheels suffered from low ductility, usually ranging from 2–3% elongation. Because light-alloy wheels at the time were often made of magnesium (often referred to as "mags"), these early wheel failures were later attributed to magnesium's low ductility, when in many instances these wheels were poorly cast aluminium alloy wheels. Once these aluminium casting improvements were more widely adopted, the aluminium wheel took the place of magnesium as low cost, high-performance wheels for motorsports.

== Characteristics ==
Lighter wheels can improve handling by reducing unsprung mass, allowing suspension to follow the terrain more closely and thus improve grip, however not all alloy wheels are lighter than their steel equivalents. Reduction in overall vehicle mass can also help to reduce fuel consumption.

Better heat conduction and a more open wheel design can help dissipate heat from the brakes, which improves braking performance in more demanding driving conditions and reduces the chance of diminished brake performance or even failure due to overheating.

Alloy wheels are also purchased for cosmetic purposes although the cheaper alloys used are usually not corrosion-resistant. Alloys allow the use of attractive bare-metal finishes, but these need to be sealed with paint or wheel covers. Even if so protected the wheels in use will eventually start to corrode after 3 to 5 years but refurbishment is now widely available at a cost. The manufacturing processes also allow intricate, bold designs. In contrast, steel wheels are usually pressed from sheet metal, and then welded together (often leaving unsightly bumps) and must be painted to avoid corrosion and/or hidden with wheel covers/hub caps.

Alloy wheels are prone to galvanic corrosion, which can cause the tires to leak air if appropriate preventive measures are not taken. Also, alloy wheels are more difficult to repair than steel wheels when bent, but their higher price usually makes repairs cheaper than replacement.

Alloy wheels are more expensive to produce than standard steel wheels, and thus are often not included as standard equipment, instead being marketed as optional add-ons or as part of a more expensive trim package. Alloy wheels have long been included as standard equipment on higher-priced vehicles, particularly luxury or sports cars, with larger-sized or "exclusive" alloy wheels being options. The high cost of alloy wheels makes them attractive to thieves; to counter this, automakers and dealers often use locking lug nuts or bolts which require a special key to remove.

Most alloy wheels are manufactured using casting, but some are forged. Forged wheels are usually lighter, stronger, but much more expensive than cast wheels. There are two types of forged wheels: one piece and modular. Modular forged wheels may feature two- or three-piece design. Typical multi-piece wheels consist of the inner rim base, outer rim lip and wheel center piece with openings for lug nuts. All parts of a modular wheel are held with bolts. BBS RS is one of the most famous three-piece modular forged wheels.

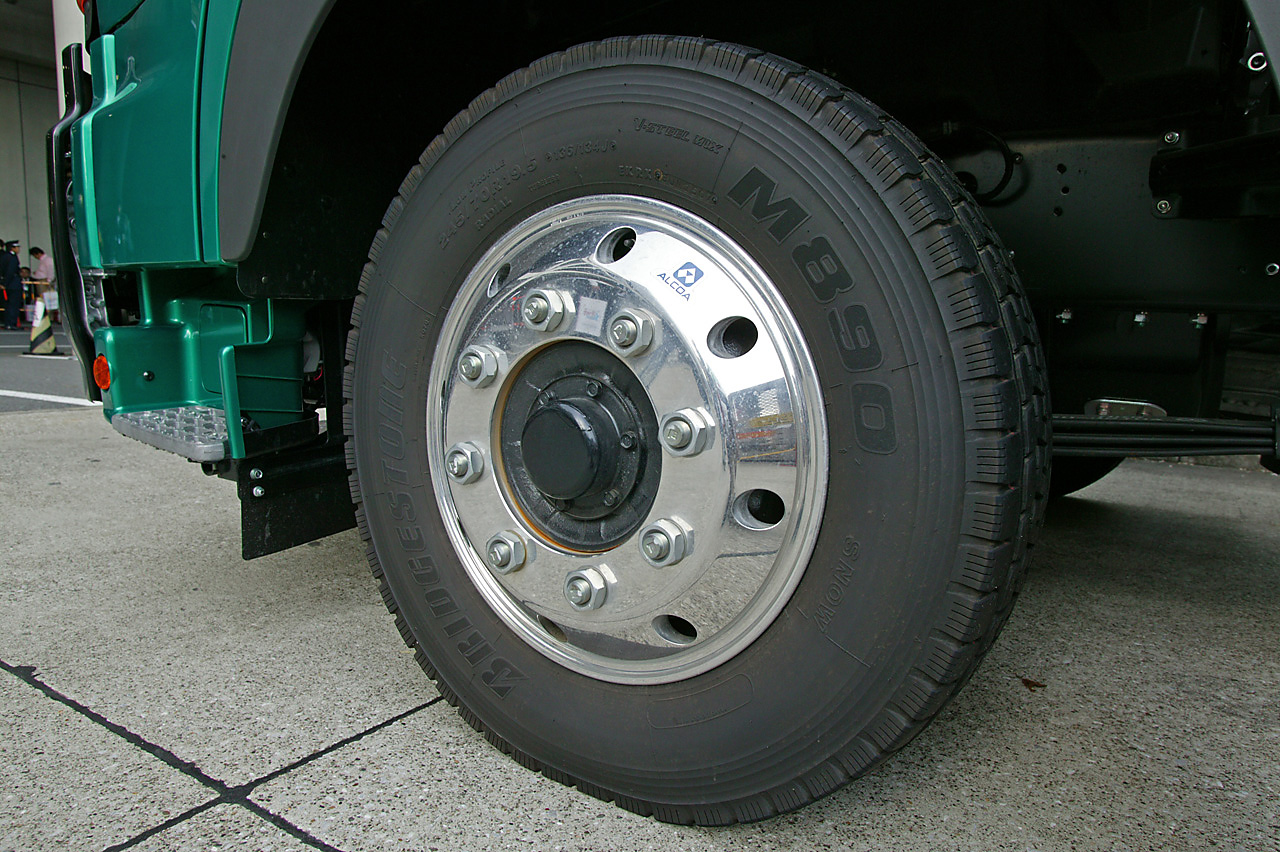
Alcoa's heavy-duty alloy wheel, for buses and trucks.

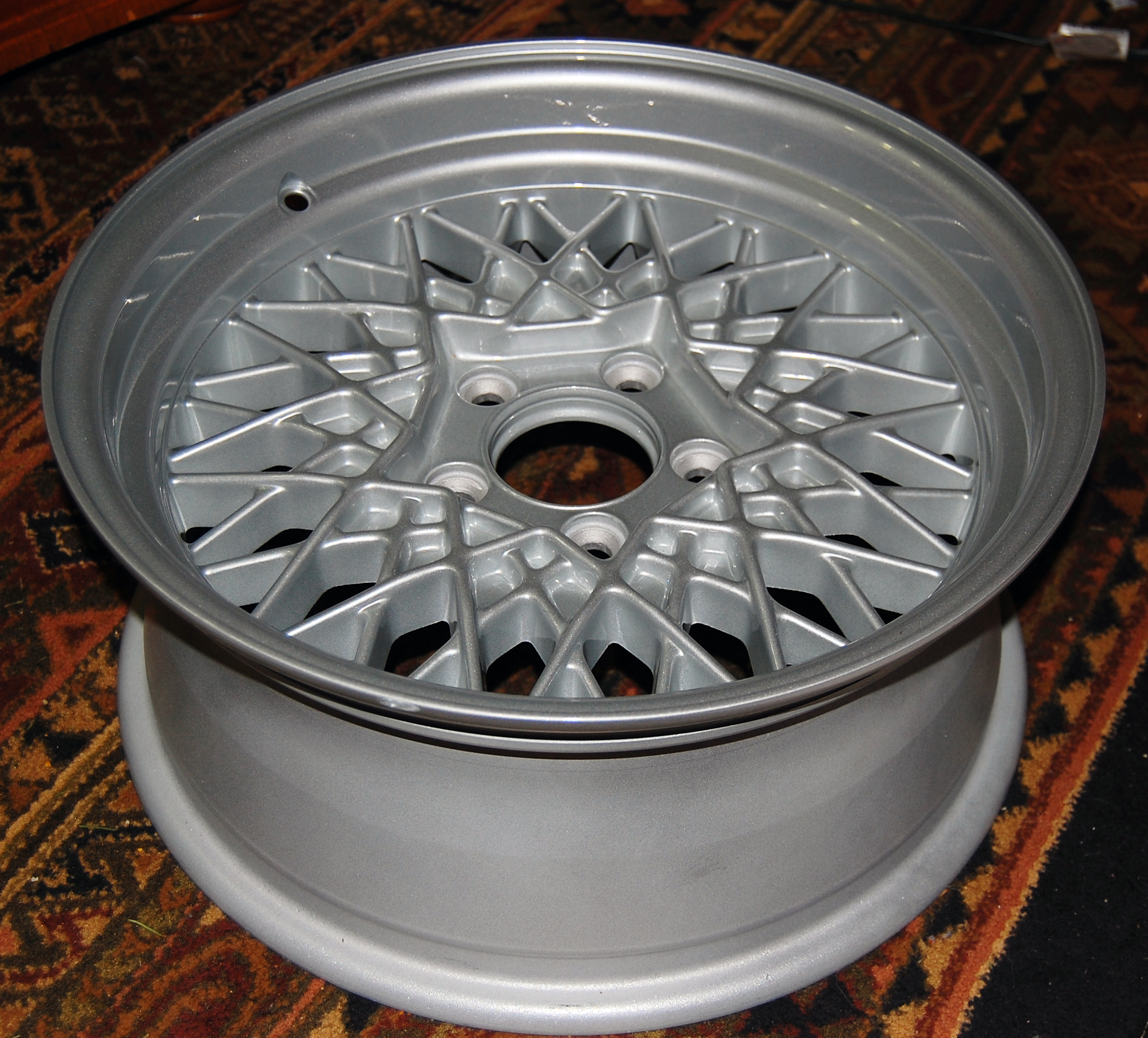
An aluminium alloy wheel designed to recall the crossed spokes of a wire wheel

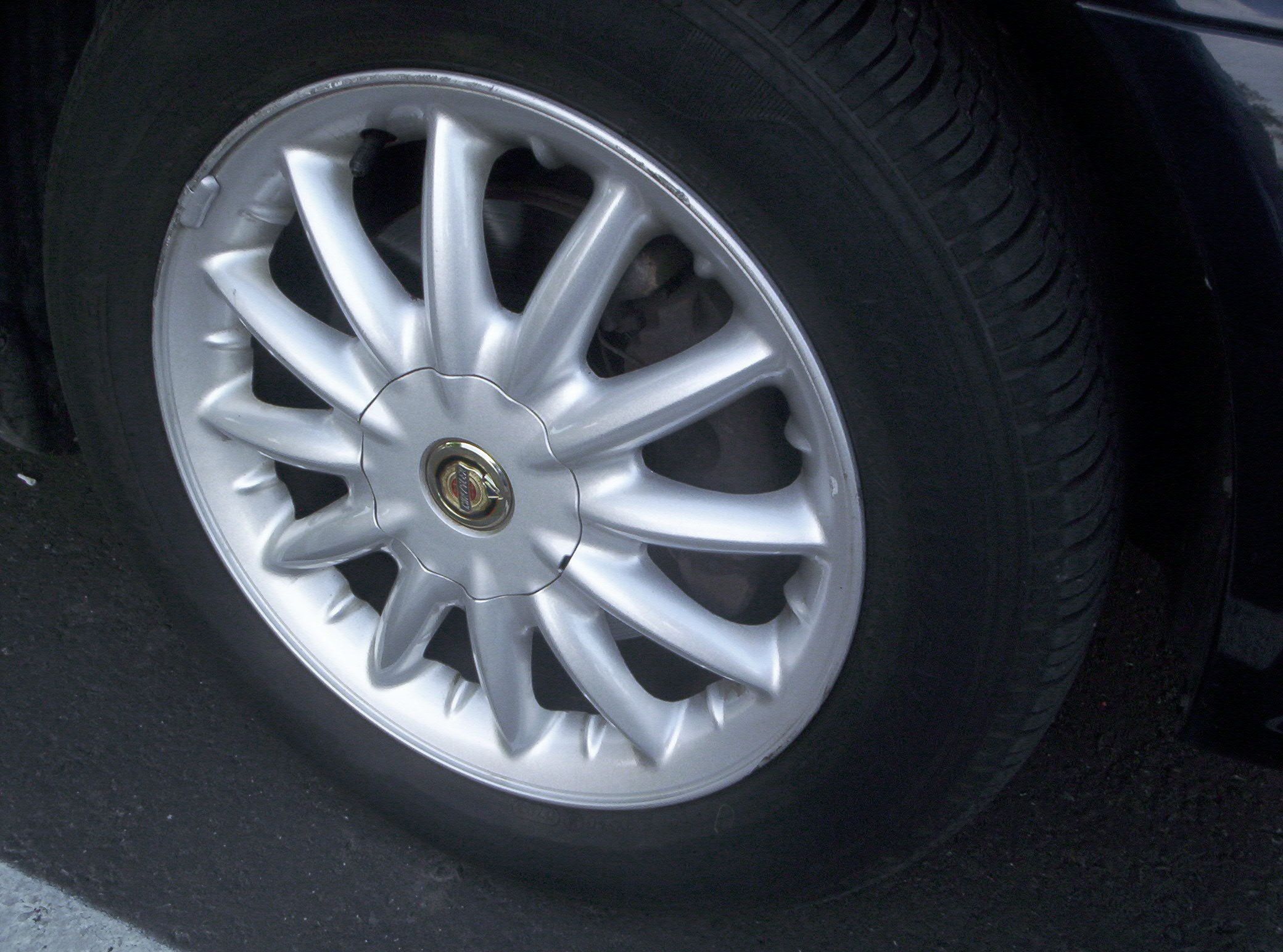
Chrysler alloy wheel

== Aftermarket wheels ==
A sizable selection of alloy wheels are available to automobile owners who want lighter, more visually appealing, rarer, and/or larger wheels on their cars, going from 14 and 15-inch standard wheels up to 30-inch wheel sizes. With the larger alloy wheels came Tru-Spinner Wheels and spinner wheel add-on spinners that would free-spin and continue to free-spin after the alloy wheel itself came to rest. American inventor James JD Gragg of International and American Tru-Spinners were the original ones and were leaders in the industry. Another function of Tru-Spinners was they could also spin backward as the alloy wheel was rolling forward. Although replacing standard steel wheel and tire combinations with lighter alloy wheels and potentially lower profile tires can result in increased performance and handling, this doesn't necessarily hold when increasingly large wheels are employed. Research by Car and Driver conducted using a selection of differently sized alloy wheels from 16 to 19 in (41 to 48 cm) all outfitted with the same make and model of tires showed that both acceleration and fuel economy suffered with larger wheels. They also noted that ride comfort and noise were negatively affected by the larger wheels.

== Magnesium alloy wheels ==
Magnesium alloy wheels were the first die-cast wheels produced, and were often referred to as simply "mag wheels". Magnesium wheels were originally used for racing, but their popularity during the 1960s led to the development of other die-cast wheels, particularly of aluminium alloys. The term "mag wheels" became synonymous with die-cast wheels made from any material, from modern aluminium alloy wheels to plastic and composite wheels used on items like bicycles, wheelchairs, and skateboards.

However, pure magnesium wheels are no longer produced, being found only on classic cars. Pure magnesium suffers from many problems. Vintage magnesium rims were very susceptible to pitting, cracking and corrosion. Magnesium in bulk is hard to ignite but pure magnesium wheels can be ignited by a burning tire or by prolonged scraping of the wheel on the road surface following a puncture. Alloys of magnesium were later developed to alleviate most of these problems. In fact, US Federal Aviation Administration has conducted wide-ranging tests over the past decade, and has reached a conclusion that potential flammability of magnesium is no longer deemed to be a concern. Modern surface treatment technologies provide protection from corrosion and significantly extend the average lifecycle of magnesium rims.

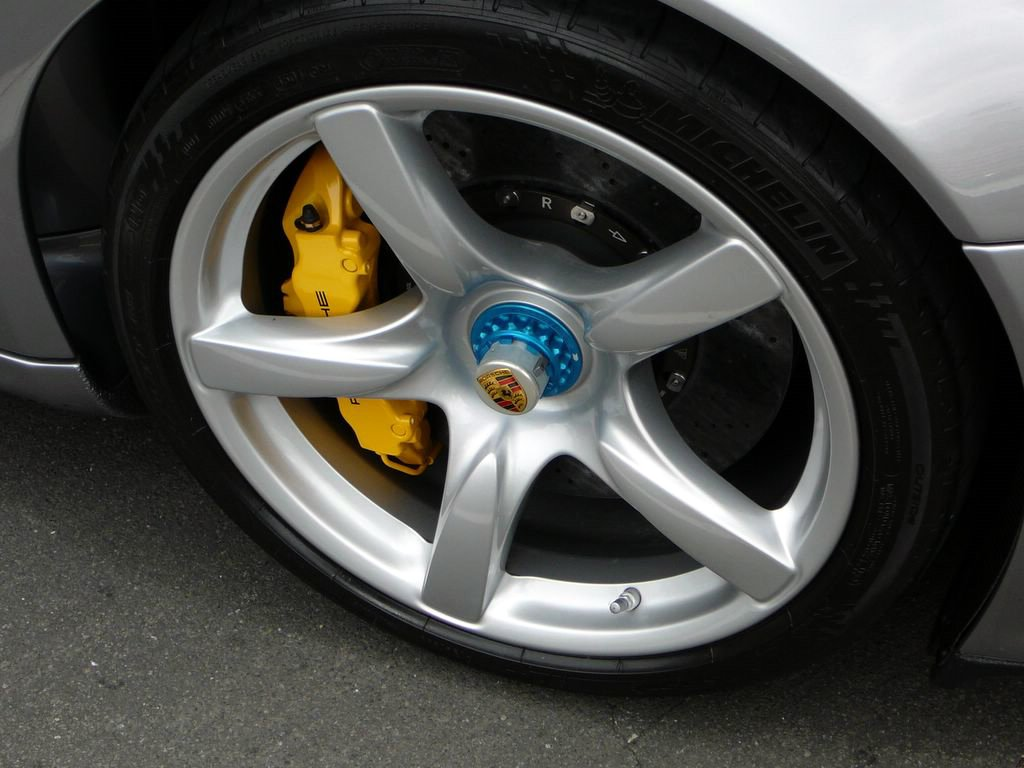
Magnesium alloy wheel on a Porsche Carrera GT

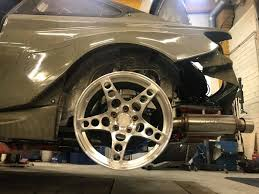
Magnesium forged alloy wheel on a BMW motorsports car

== Production methods ==
=== Forging ===
Forging can be done by a one or multistep process forging from various magnesium alloys, most commonly AZ80, ZK60 (MA14 in Russia). Wheels produced by this method are usually of higher toughness and ductility than aluminium wheels, although the costs are much higher. Forging is a complicated process that involves such processes, as heating, rolling, applying high pressure, hammering and/or combination of these. As a result, the crystal structure of the alloy changes, and as a result the material becomes stronger and more lightweight.

=== Assembly ===
There are one- two- and three-piece forged wheels. Every piece is originally an alloy billet, which is further transformed into a wheel, in cases of one-piece forged wheels, or into a wheel part in cases of multi-piece wheels.

=== High pressure die casting ===
This process uses a die arranged in a large machine that has high closing force to clamp the die closed. The molten magnesium is poured into a filler tube called a shot sleeve. A piston pushes the metal into the die with high speed and pressure, the magnesium solidifies, and the die is opened, and the wheel is released. Wheels produced by this method can offer reductions in price and improvements in corrosion resistance, but they are less ductile and of lower strength due to the nature of high pressure die casting.

=== Low pressure die casting ===
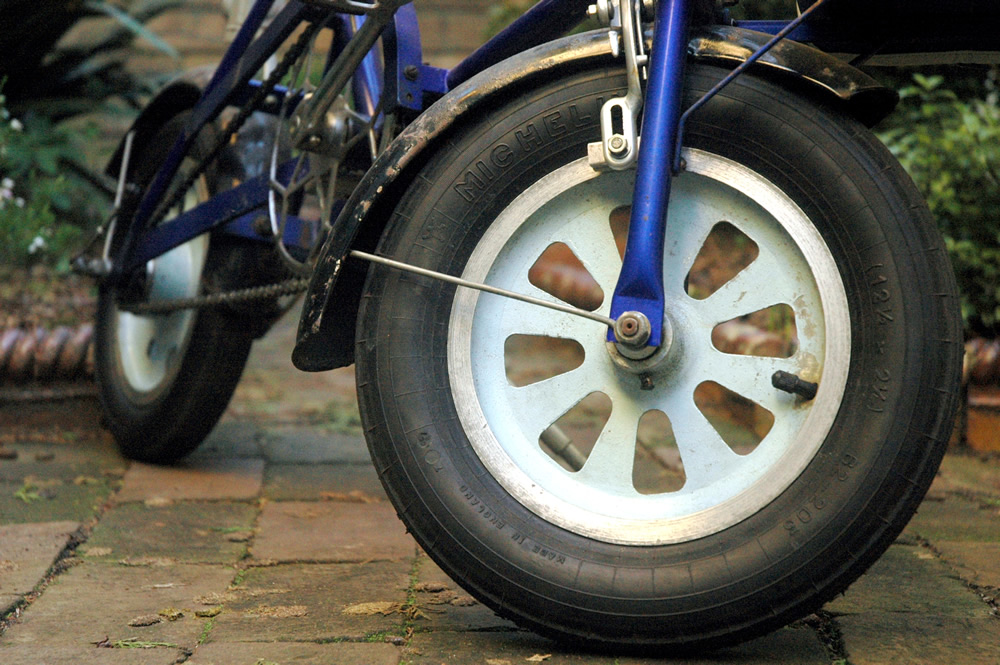
Gravity cast alloy bicycle wheel. 1960s Bootie Folding Cycle

This process usually employs a steel die, it is arranged above the crucible filled with molten magnesium. Most commonly, the crucible is sealed against the die and pressurized air/cover gas mix is used to force the molten metal up a straw-like filler tube into the die.

When processed using best practice methods, low pressure die casting wheels can offer improvements in ductility over magnesium wheels and any cast aluminium wheels, they remain less ductile than forged magnesium.

=== Gravity casting ===
Gravity-cast magnesium wheels have been in production since the early 1920s and provide good ductility, and relative properties above what can be made with aluminium casting. Tooling costs for gravity-cast wheels are among the cheapest of any process. This has allowed small batch production, flexibility in design and short development time.

== See also ==
- Cast alloy wheels
