= Vehicle extrication =

Process of removing a person trapped in a vehicle

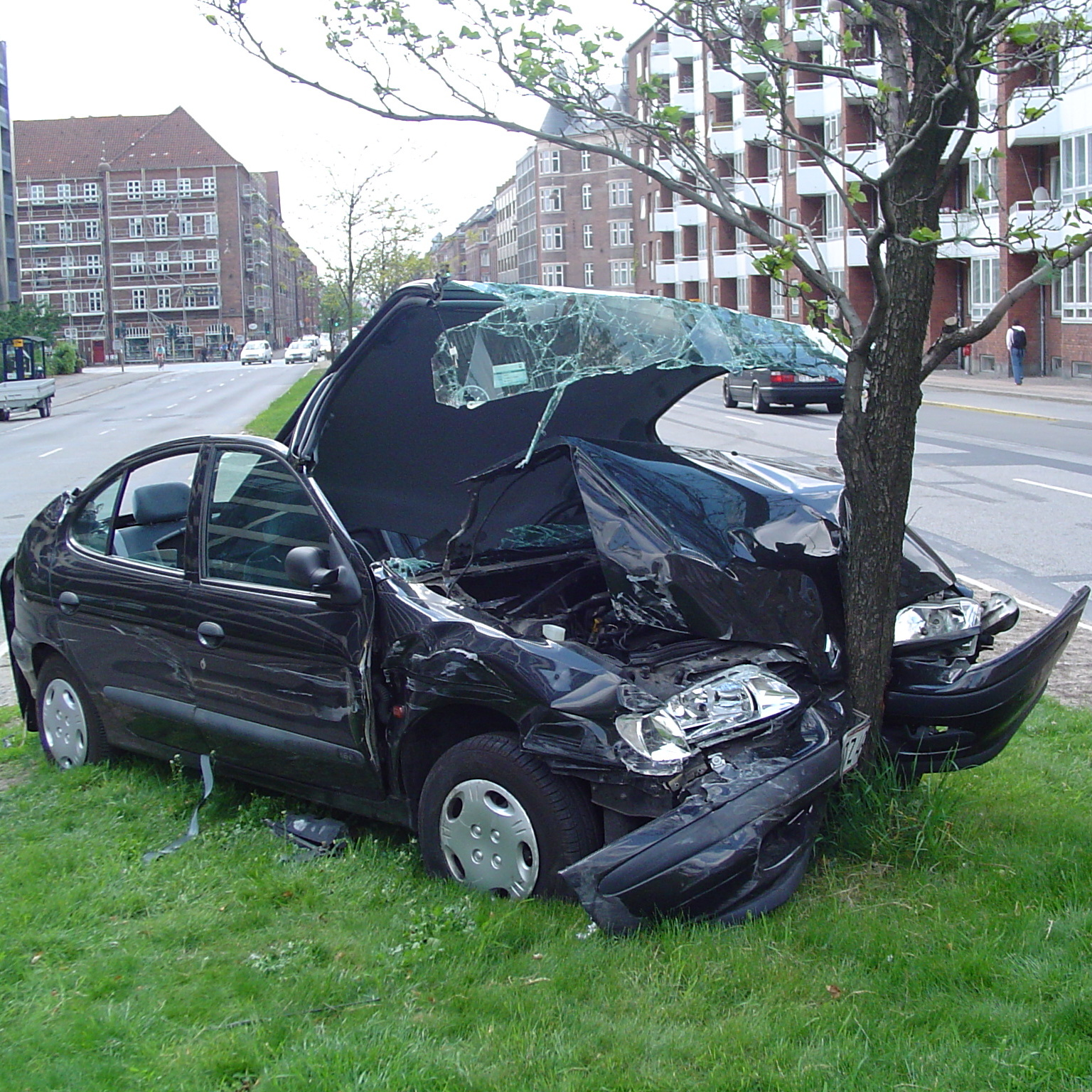
Crashed car in Copenhagen.

Vehicle extrication is the process of removing a patient from a vehicle which has been involved in a motor vehicle collision. Patients who have not already exited a crashed vehicle may be medically (cannot exit a vehicle due to their injuries) or physically trapped, or unable to exit the vehicle because a door will not open.

== Operations ==
Once an incident scene is protected, extrication can commence. Vehicle extrication can be considered in six phases. These phases are:

1. Safety and Scene Assessment
2. Stabilisation and Initial Access
3. Glass Management
4. Space Creation
5. Full Access
6. Immobilisation and Extrication

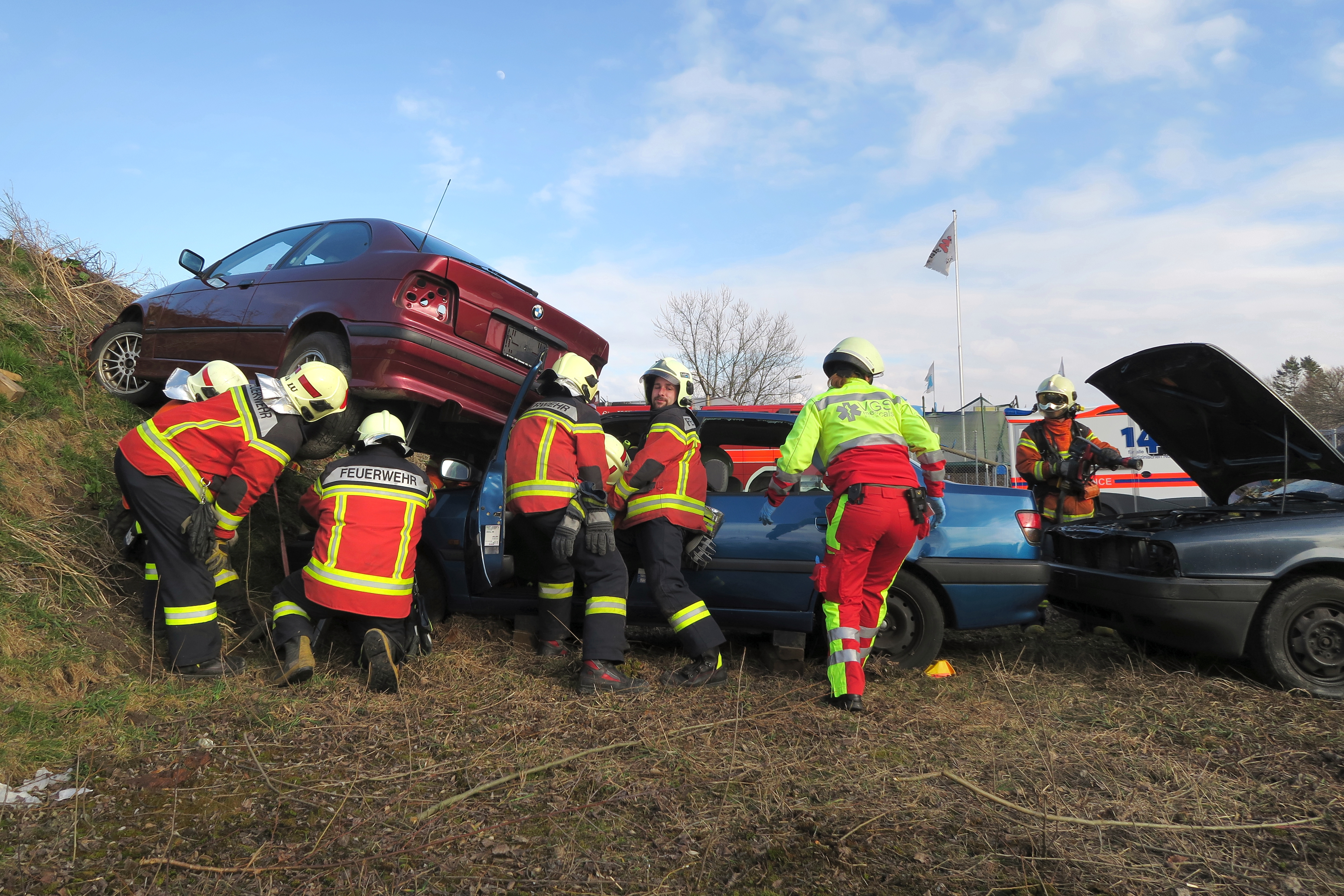
A team of firefighters and rescue technicians secure vehicles during a training operation.

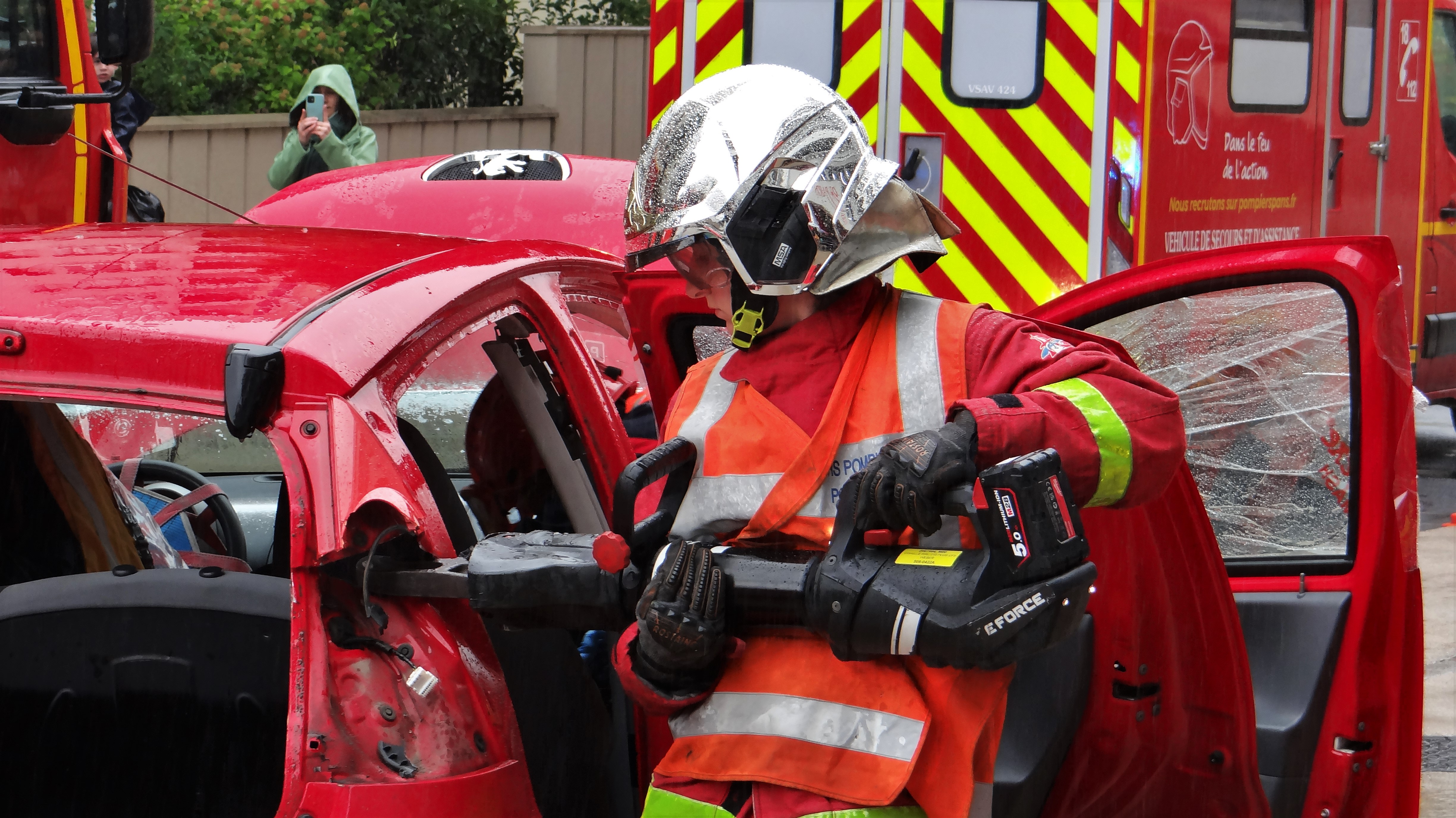
Extrication demonstration in Paris

=== Safety and Scene Assessment ===
Once a scene is protected, for example from other moving traffic, the fire service commander will complete a rapid assessment to identify any significant hazards that may present immediate risks to emergency service workers, members of the public or the patient or patients. This may include fire, hazardous substances, the risk of falling from a height, or being electrocuted or injured by falling material from a damaged building. Steps are then taken to mitigate these risks.

=== Stabilisation and Initial Access ===
==== Stabilisation can be thought of as three phases. ====
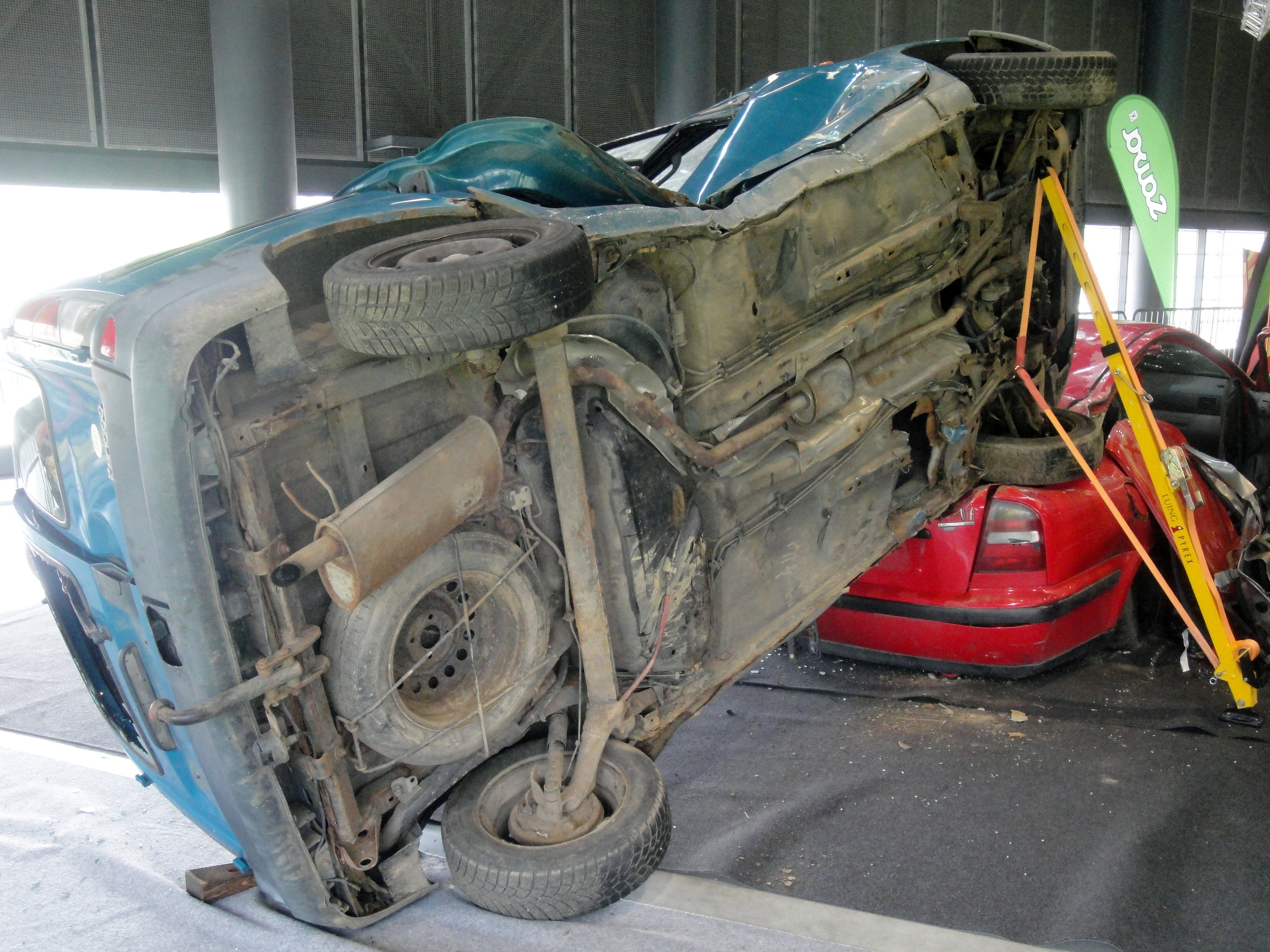
A crashed car being stabilised

Phase 1 is rapid stabilisation, these are simple methods to improve vehicle stability:

- Applying a parking brake
- Applying a wheel chock
- Applying a winch wire
- Deflating tyres (this may compromise subsequent rescue efforts and forensic investigations)
- Electrically isolating the vehicle
- Using personnel to brace the vehicle

Phase 2 is stabilisation achieved using chocks and wedges under and around the vehicle.

Phase 3 is the use of additional equipment to stabilise a vehicle. This may be more complex and include:

- Hydraulic/pneumatic stability equipment
- Lifting bags
- Struts

=== Glass Management ===
Glass management involves controlling the risk posed by the windows of the vehicle. This is not just the removal of the vehicle’s windows: it must also include the control of any glass fragments which may pose a risk to the patient and attending emergency service personnel, or which could damage equipment, especially hydraulic hoses.

=== Space Creation ===
The space creation step starts with a structural assessment of the involved vehicle to determine which vehicle components could be simply opened, moved, or manipulated by utilising a vehicle’s natural design features. This would include opening doors, windows or sunroofs and moving/removing seats or headrests. Beyond that, an extrication plan will be formulated which details which vehicle body parts will need to be removed, displaced or reformed to allow access to the patient or patients. A number of specific techniques can be utilised and these are discussed later.

Consideration should also be given to moving the vehicle involved in the incident if that will aid space creation. Moving vehicles with patients still inside is permissible if deemed safe. Relocation of crashed vehicles may:

- Improve safety
- Reduce rescue times
- Provide better access to the casualty

=== Full Access ===
Full access aims to ensure that there is enough space to meet and exceed a patient's clinical requirements and to meet the needs of emergency service personnel. Space creation should allow access for medically trained responders to reach the patient. They can assess the patient and if required undertake medical interventions: for example, stopping bleeding, opening obstructed airways, providing medications such as oxygen or tranexamic acid.

=== Immobilisation and Extrication ===
It used to be thought that individuals involved in road traffic collisions needed extremely careful handling, including the use of cervical spine collars and spinal immobilisation boards. This is not however supported by the available evidence base. Patients should be encouraged or assisted to self-extricate from the crashed vehicle as a first-line extrication plan, unless:

- the patient cannot understand or follow instructions, or
- the patient is unable to stand (or it is suspected that they would be unable to stand) on at least one leg, due either to injury or to another condition, for example:
  - Impalement
  - Suspected pelvic fracture
  - Suspected or confirmed bilateral leg fractures
  - Signs of head injury (significant dizziness or confusion)

If extrication is required, patients should not be transported on a rigid extrication (spinal) board, as this can cause pressure injuries, and false positives on later examination of the back. Cervical collars do not adequately protect the neck, but they raise intracranial pressure, impede airway management and cause pressure ulcers, and their routine use is not advised in the developed world, and if used they should be loosened at the earliest opportunity.

== Extrication tools and equipment ==
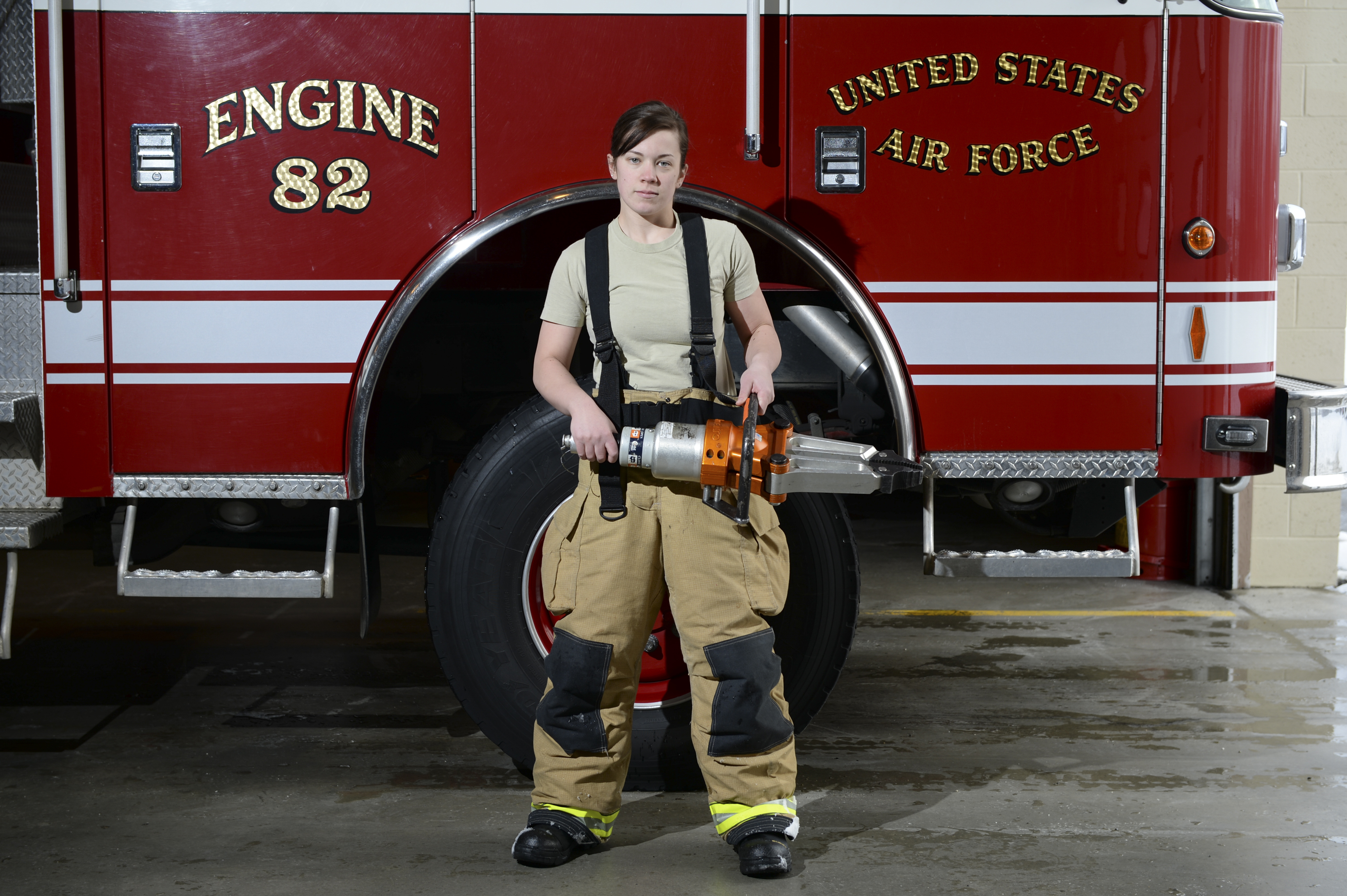
U.S. Air Force Civil Engineer Squadron firefighter, holding a spreader, a hydraulic vehicle extrication tool designed to free crash victims from automobile wreckage and other rescues from small spaces.

Rescue personnel may use a number of powered rescue tools to extricate victims. There are three main types of powered rescue tools including:

- Hydraulic rescue tools – Rescue tools powered by a hydraulic pump. The pump may be powered by hand, an electric motor or a gasoline engine. They may be portable or mounted to a vehicle. There are 4 basic types of hydraulic rescue tools:
  - Spreaders,
  - Shears (Often referred to as the Jaws of Life),
  - Combination spreader/shears,
  - Extrication extension rams.
- Pneumatic rescue tools – Rescue tools that are powered by pressurized air. The pressurized air is sourced from SCBA cylinders, vehicle mounted cascade systems or air compressors. Saws, Air bags, air shores and air chisels are examples of pneumatically powered rescue tools.
- Electric rescue tools – Rescue tools that are powered by electrical power. Powered through power cords linked to electricity generators and through batteries. Reciprocating saws, spreaders, shears, extension rams, and spreader/shears can all be electrically powered.

Stabilization tools include:

- Hydraulic and nonhydraulic jacks – Designed to lift the vehicle.
- Buttress Tension System – A buttress tension system is used to stabilize a vehicle resting on its side or top. It may consist of a minimum of three 4 x 4 inch posts wedged between the vehicle and the ground, or it may be a system composed of metal rods and straps. The exact placement varies by the condition and weight of the vehicle as well as what the vehicle is resting on.
- Wheel chock – Wheel chocks are used to stabilize vehicles resting on their wheels. They are commonly constructed of aluminum, hard rubber, wood, or urethane plastic.
- Cribbing – Cribbing consist of wood or plastic blocks that are made in a variety of shapes and sizes.
- Pneumatic lifting bag – Pneumatic lifting bags are air-pressurized devices that lift objects. They come in three basic types: high-pressure, medium-pressure and low-pressure. They are usually made with a rubber exterior reinforced with steel wire or Kevlar. When deflated they are about one inch thick.
- Winches – Winches are usually vehicle mounted. They are used in conjunction with chains or cables.

Other equipment that can be used during a vehicle extrication include but are not limited to:

- Gasoline rotary saw – A well-maintained gasoline rotary saw can be fitted with various blades: carbide toothed blades, abrasive blades, and diamond blades are among the common blade choices for rescue operations.
- Reciprocating saw – This is a versatile tool, the blades for reciprocating saws have undergone recent changes in composition. High-end carbide-tipped blades have had proven results in the fire service and can cut boron.
- Angle grinders
- Impact wrench/air ratchet – when paired with the right sockets, will speed up disassembly tasks. Air chisels are also ideal for rescue work. Depending on the tool size, capabilities may range from sheet metal to plate steel. Larger style air chisels are also effective on concrete.
- Oxy-fuel cutting torches may be oxygen gasoline, oxygen, acetylene, or exothermic type torches. Space limitations on the rig often determine the size of the cylinders and, therefore, the torch capabilities.
- Tempered and laminated glass removal tools – Tools designed specifically for glass removal are more appropriate than traditional forcible-entry tools. They create less shock to the vehicle and limit patient compartment intrusion.
- Pliers, adjustable wrenches, screwdrivers, etc. – Tools such as these can be used to disconnect the 12-volt battery system; remove interior trim at all push, pull and cut locations; disassemble vehicle components, etc.
- Wire cutters and seatbelt cutters – Almost any disentanglement tactic requires wires and/or seatbelts to be severed for the complete removal of components. Having easy, quick tools readily available makes quick work of these tedious tasks.
- Razor knife – A sharp blade can be used to expose upholstered areas during operations.

== Vehicular technical rescue techniques ==
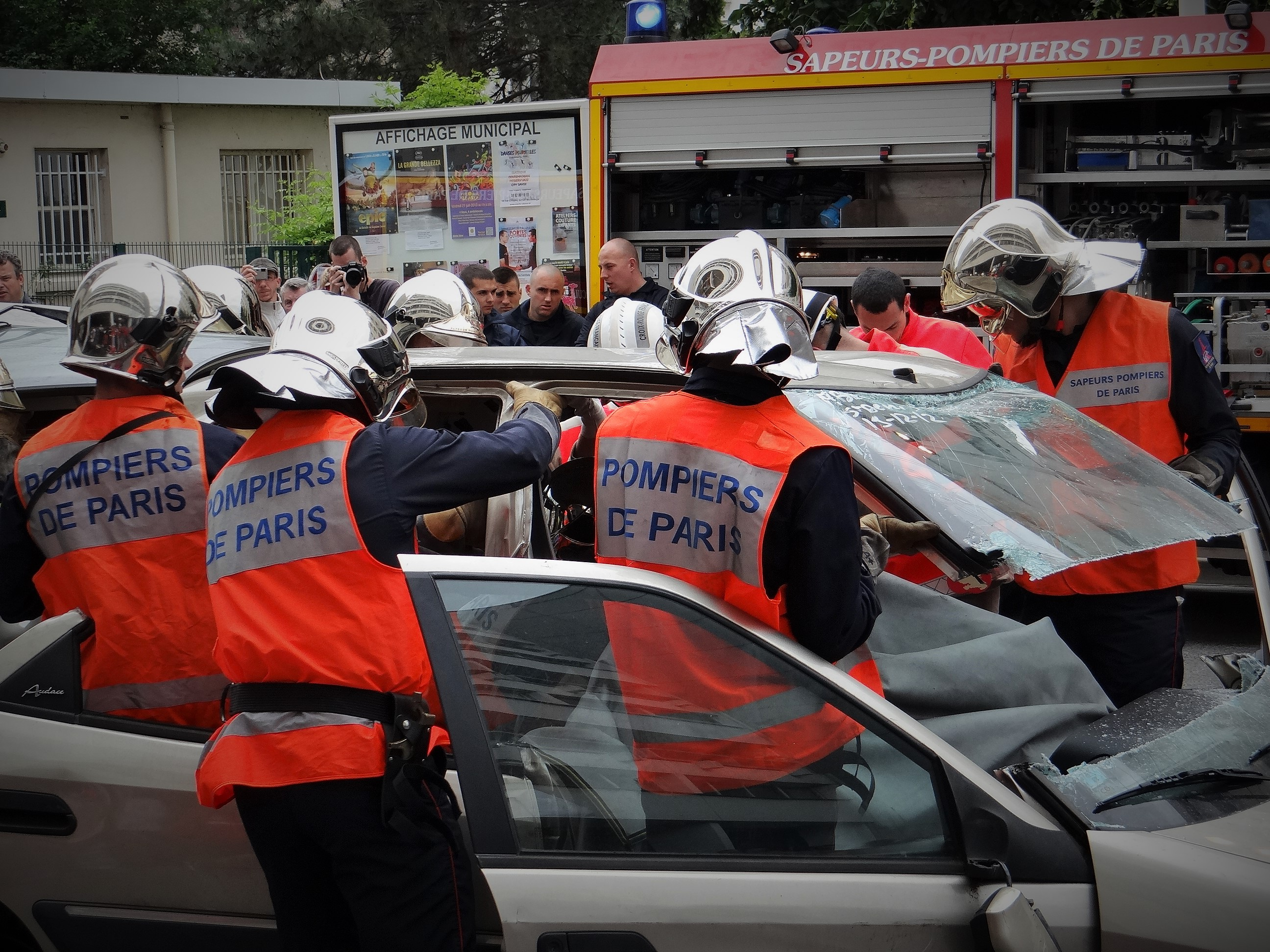
Roof removal being demonstrated

These include:

- Roof removal
- Roof flap

A roof flap can be undertaken forwards, backwards or sideways. The technique is similar for all three, but the direction the roof is "folded" differs. The steps to perform this technique (forwards) would include:

1. Remove the glass from all side and rear windows
2. Cut all seatbelts
3. Strip trim around cutting points
4. Cut all roof pillars except front A-pillars
5. Cut “hinge” cuts in roof rail at windshield at the front of the car
6. Flap roof forward and secure in position
7. Cover sharps
- Pedal displacement
- B-post rip

Removal of the B-post or B-Pillar of a vehicle to allow improved access. The B-pillar is located between a vehicle's front and rear side glass, where it serves as a structural support of its roof, its removal leaves the side of a car wide open.

- Third Door creation

Third door creation (or conversion) provides additional access to patients in 2 door cars.

- Dash roll

The dashboard and steering column can intrude into the passenger compartment and crush a patient or restrict their movement. A dash roll, or dash relocation aims to create space by moving the dashboard away from the patient.

== Additional risks ==
=== Airbags ===
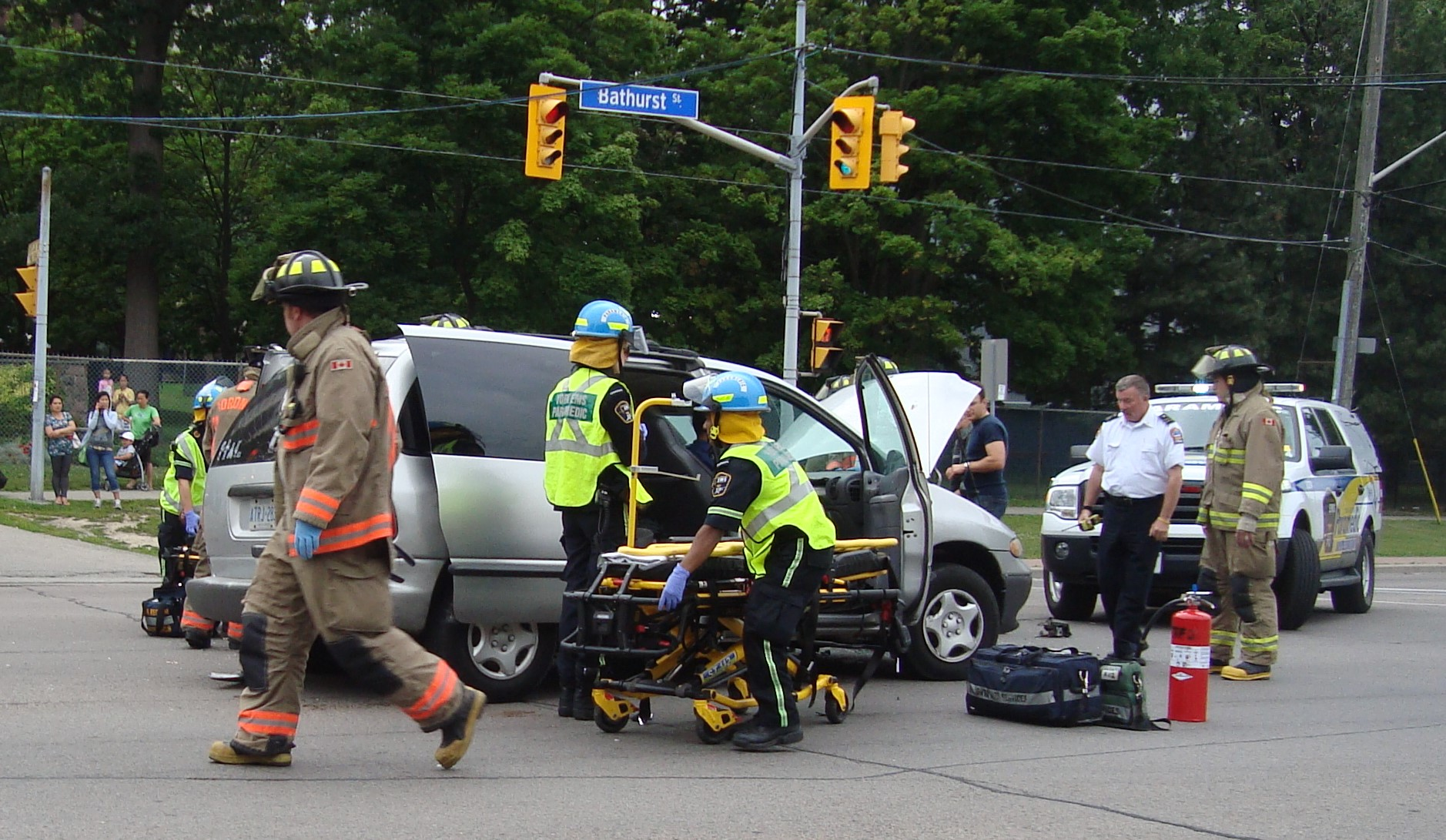
Paramedics successfully extract the victim of a crash in Toronto

Active systems such as airbags make cutting into a vehicle more complicated: when they are not set off during the crash (e.g. in a vehicle struck from the rear or a rollover), extrication operations may set them off. This can cause additional trauma to the victim or to the rescuers. Airbags can remain active anywhere from 5 seconds to 20 minutes after being disconnected from the car's battery. This is one of the reasons rescuers disconnect the vehicle's battery and wait before cutting into a vehicle.

=== Hood Hinge Struts ===
Hood hinge struts can pose a great amount of danger to rescuers who are extricating a victim from a car that had any significant heat in the engine compartment. According to the strut manufacturers, these sealed and pressurized struts are designed to operate at temperatures ranging from 40 degrees Fahrenheit to 284 degrees Fahrenheit. No manufacturer could provide any evidence that any testing at temperatures above 284 degrees Fahrenheit had ever been conducted. During a vehicle fire, especially an engine compartment fire, the two hood hinge struts will be exposed to high heat levels. Since there is no pressure relief "valve" on any of these sealed and pressurized struts, the units can fail violently when overheated. Unfortunately for firefighters, this failure can actually "launch" the entire strut or just one part of the unit a significant distance off the vehicle like an unguided missile. It is the launching of the heated strut that in several incidents across the United States, has caused serious injury to firefighters.

=== Hybrid Cars ===
New hybrid technologies also include additional high voltage batteries, or batteries located in unusual places. These can expose occupants and rescuers to shock, acid or fire hazards if not dealt with correctly.

=== Liquid Petroleum Gas ===
Some vehicles have an additional autogas (LPG) tank. As the system was not built in, there is a risk of damaging the pipe which is often under the car, releasing the pressurized fuel. The risk of this is minimized by locating the line in a protected position during installation. Modern installations also have a shutoff solenoid at the tank so that rupture will only release the fuel in the line rather than allowing fuel to come out of the tank.

== Specific extrication challenges ==
Car manufacturers are increasingly using ultra-high-strength steel (UHSS) to increase the crash safety ratings of their vehicles. UHSS is used in areas of the vehicle such as the A-pillar, B-pillar, rockers, side impact beams, and roof beams. This steel is difficult to cut with the standard extrication tools.

Carbon fibre poses unique challenges when used to manufacture vehicles. It is light and strong and can be difficult to cut. In addition, cutting this material can produce particulates which are harmful to health, and breathing protection is required for rescuers and the casualty.

== See also ==
- Hydraulic rescue tools
- Traffic collision
- Heavy rescue vehicle
- Rescue squad
- Tram accident
- Vehicle recovery
- Firefighting
