= Cheater bar =

Improvised breaker bar

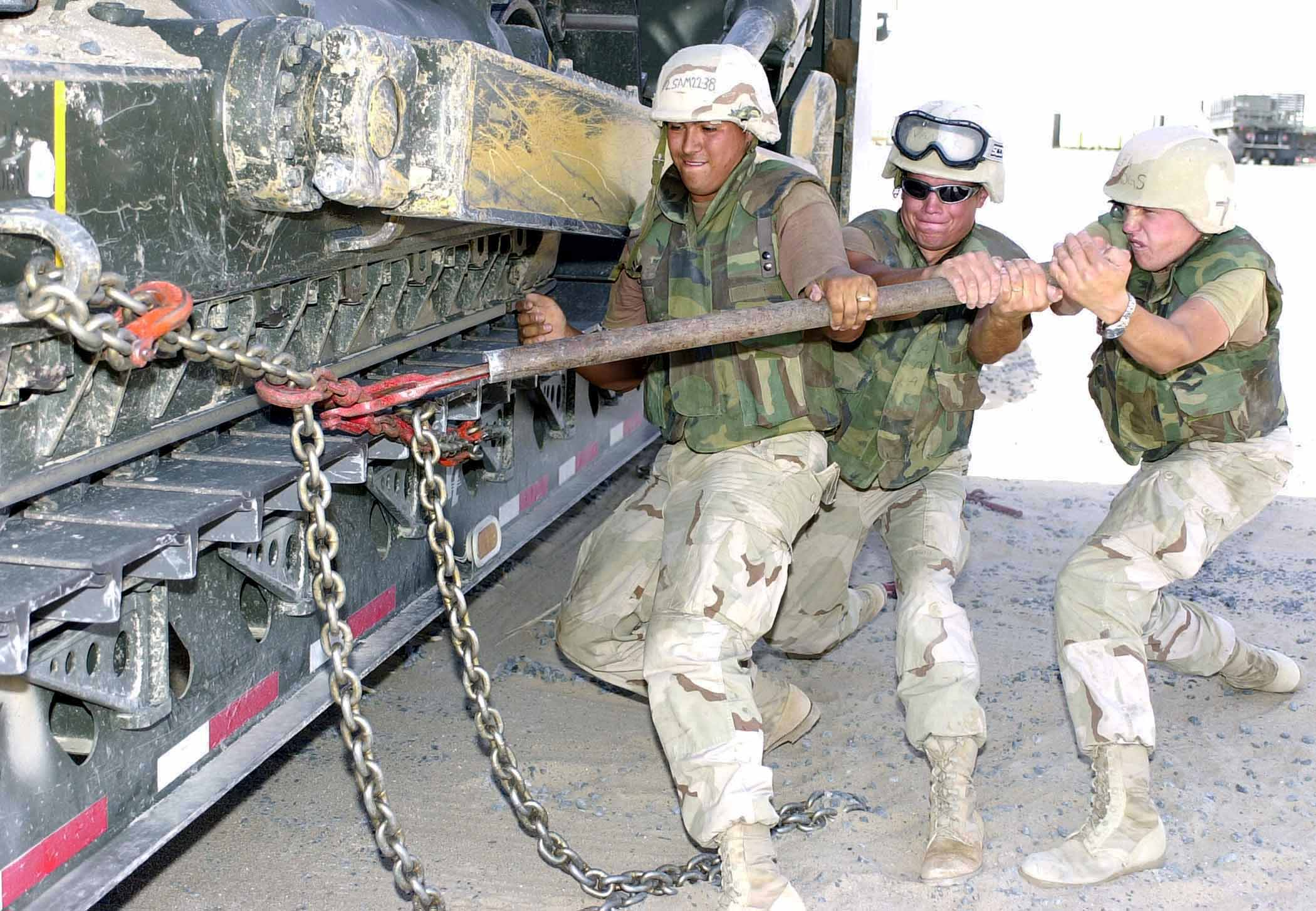
Seabees use a cheater bar to secure a bulldozer.

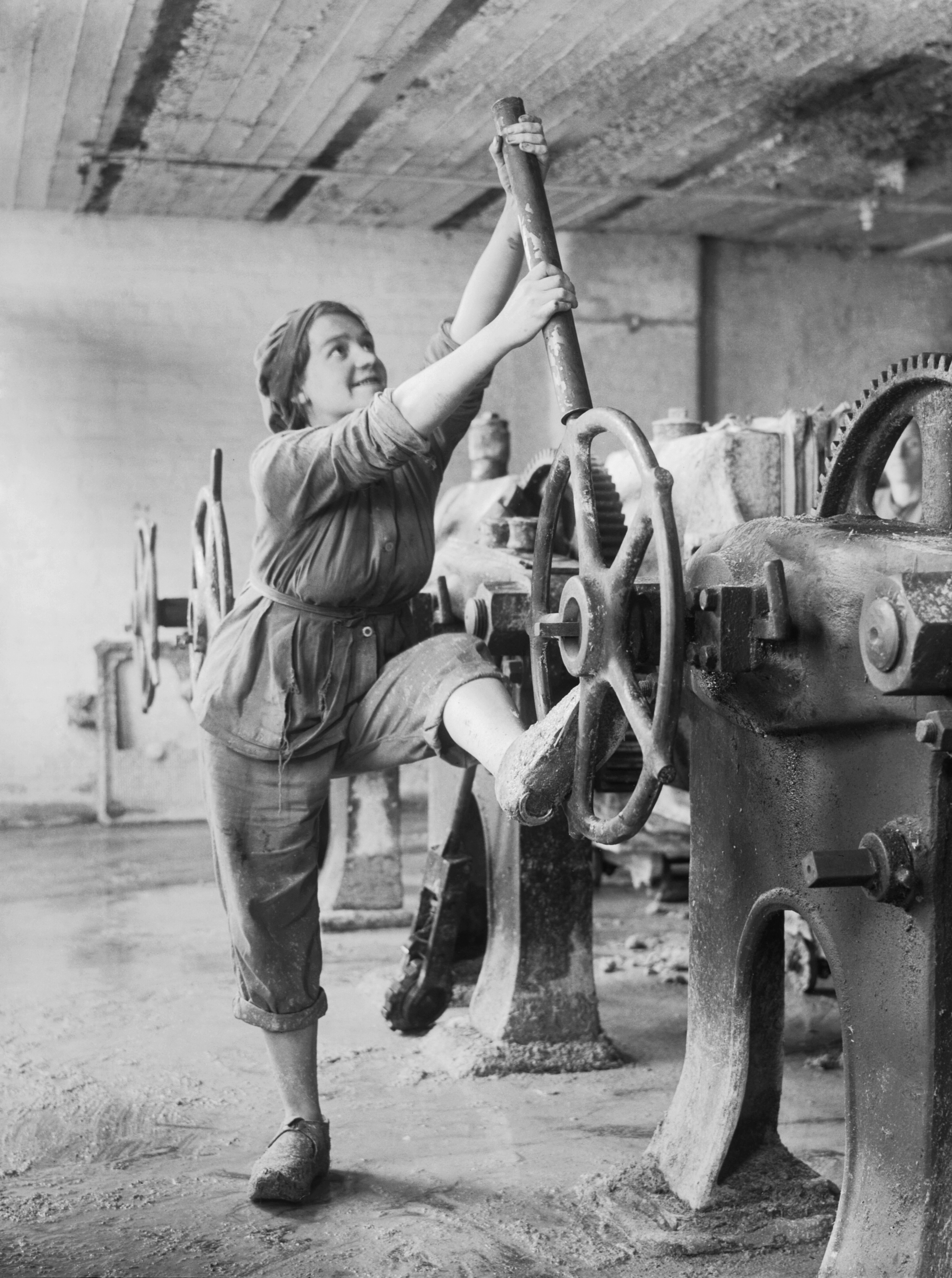
A factory worker uses a cheater bar for additional torque, September 1918

A cheater bar, snipe, or cheater pipe is an improvised breaker bar made from a length of pipe and a wrench (spanner).

== Primary use ==
Cheater bars are usually used to free threaded pipe, screws, bolts, and other fasteners that are difficult to remove with a ratchet or pipe wrench alone. They are also commonly used to operate valves.

When the handle of a pipe wrench, breaker bar, box wrench, or ratchet is inserted into a cheater bar, the additional distance makes it possible to generate the required torque with the same amount of force being applied. However, the work done is the same with or without the cheater bar because the torque and angle of rotation needed to accomplish a particular task does not change.

The cheater bar allows higher torque with the same force by

$\text{torque} = \text{radius} \times \text{force}$

A cheater bar is sometimes called a snipe, a pipe extension or an extension pipe.

== Industrial safety problems ==
Problems in using such bars include:

- All respected international and governmental safety organizations and enforcement agencies such as OSHA, MSHA, CCOHS, EU-OSHA, etc. strictly prohibit or vehemently discourage the use of cheater bars due to the extreme risk of injury or death to users and bystanders.
- If the component frees suddenly, the worker can become a projectile that is propelled into whatever is in the "line-of-fire". This could (and has) resulted in falls, impacts, punctures, and other injuries.
- The cheater bar itself can become part of a de facto catapult with the worker in the line-of-fire.
- The overtorqueing sometimes results in the failure (breakage and forceful scattering) of any of the items in the jury rig (e.g., socket, breaker bar, wrench, pipe) or of the components being worked on (e.g., nut, bolt, loadbinder), and when it does so, the fragments can injure workers in the line-of-fire.
  - In 21st-century civilian practice it is considered a basic, rudimentary part of a skillset to ensure that one's own eye protection is in place whenever a cheater is being used, as well as that of anyone nearby.
- Tribal knowledge among tradesmen traditionally has taught that cheater bars are appropriate only in certain use cases and not others. For example, it makes a distinction whereby putting a pipe onto a breaker bar (sometimes, cautiously, while expecting that the tool may break) is different from putting a pipe onto a ratchet (never, because the tool is too likely to break).

== Pump or fluid transport equipment problems ==
Ports of pumps can be damaged resulting in:

- The outlet or inlet ports can be warped.
- The pump casting or manifold can crack and then leak.

Some organizations forbid their use. For example, NASA is one such organization:

"Use the approved tool for the job. Makeshift arrangements such as the use of a screwdriver as a chisel, a pair of pliers as a wrench, a wrench as a hammer, or overloading a wrench by using a pipe extension (cheater bar) on the handle are not to be employed."

== Alternatives ==
Due to the potential problems associated with a cheater bar or snipe, some situations may require an alternative to loosening and removing threaded pipe, screws, bolts or other fasteners.

- Impact wrench – An air powered socket wrench that delivers high torque output by storing energy in a rotating mass, then delivering it suddenly to the output shaft. Nearly every auto body or mechanic shop will have an air compressor and impact wrench to loosen and tighten lug nuts on wheels. Most major tool manufacturers carry an air impact wrench, including DeWalt, Ingersoll, and Paoli SRL.
- Torque multiplier – Uses a multi-stage epicyclic gearing mechanism to multiply torque output. Torque is applied to the input gear which engages with a number of planet gears which are held in a fixed planetary gear. By using a reaction arm, the outside casing of the multiplier is prevented from rotating, causing the planet gears to rotate around the input gear. Along with the multiplication of torque, there is a decrease in rotational speed of the output shaft compared to the input shaft. This decrease in speed is inversely proportional to the increase in torque. Torque multipliers come in a variety of output ratios as well.
- Pneumatic torque wrench – Operates like the torque multiplier but is mated to a pneumatic air motor. It is essentially a mix of the compressed air powered impact wrench and the traditionally hand-operated torque multiplier, delivering aspects of both tools.
