= Lug wrench =

Type of socket wrench used to loosen and tighten lug nuts on automobile wheels

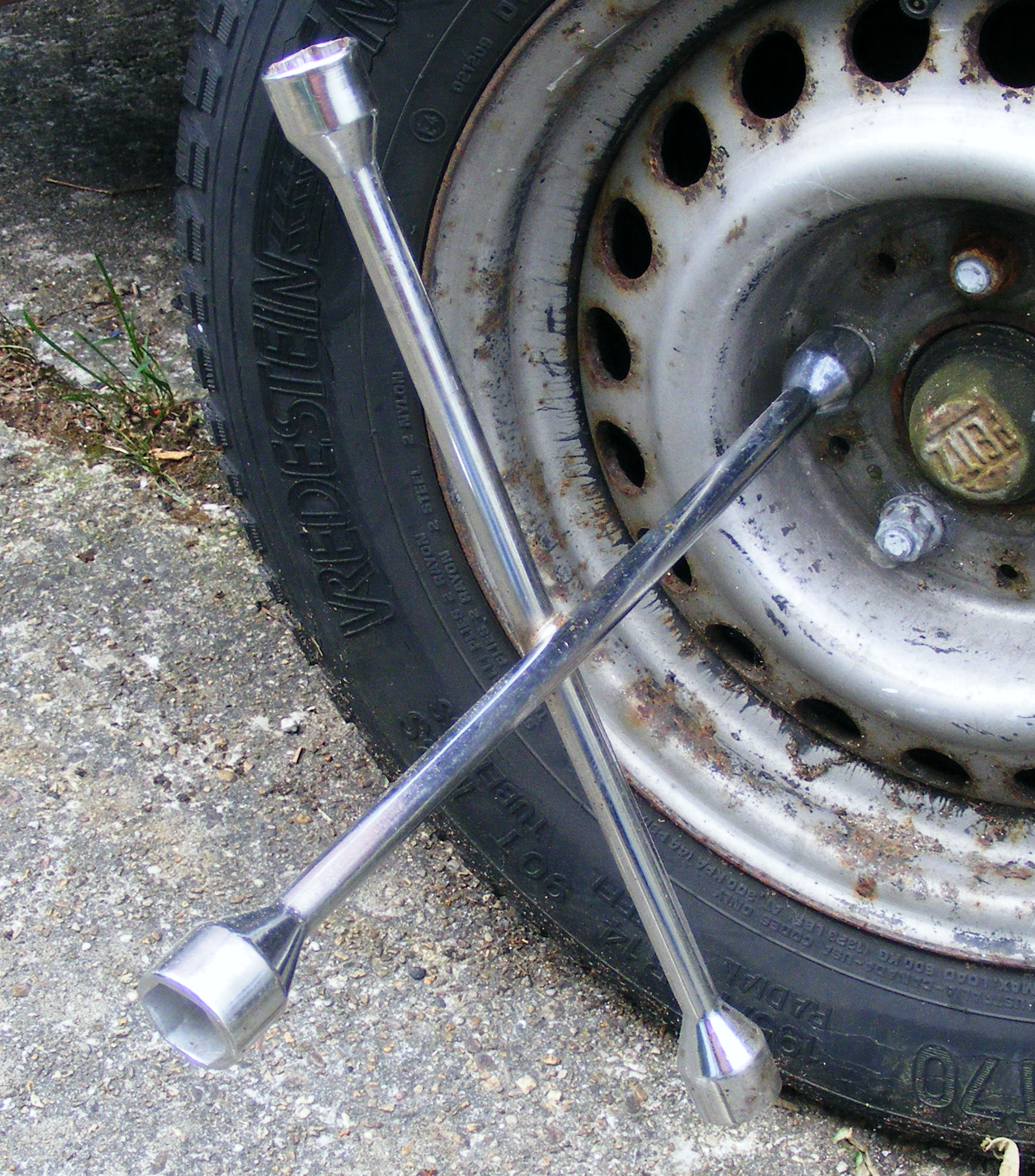
Spider-type lug wrench

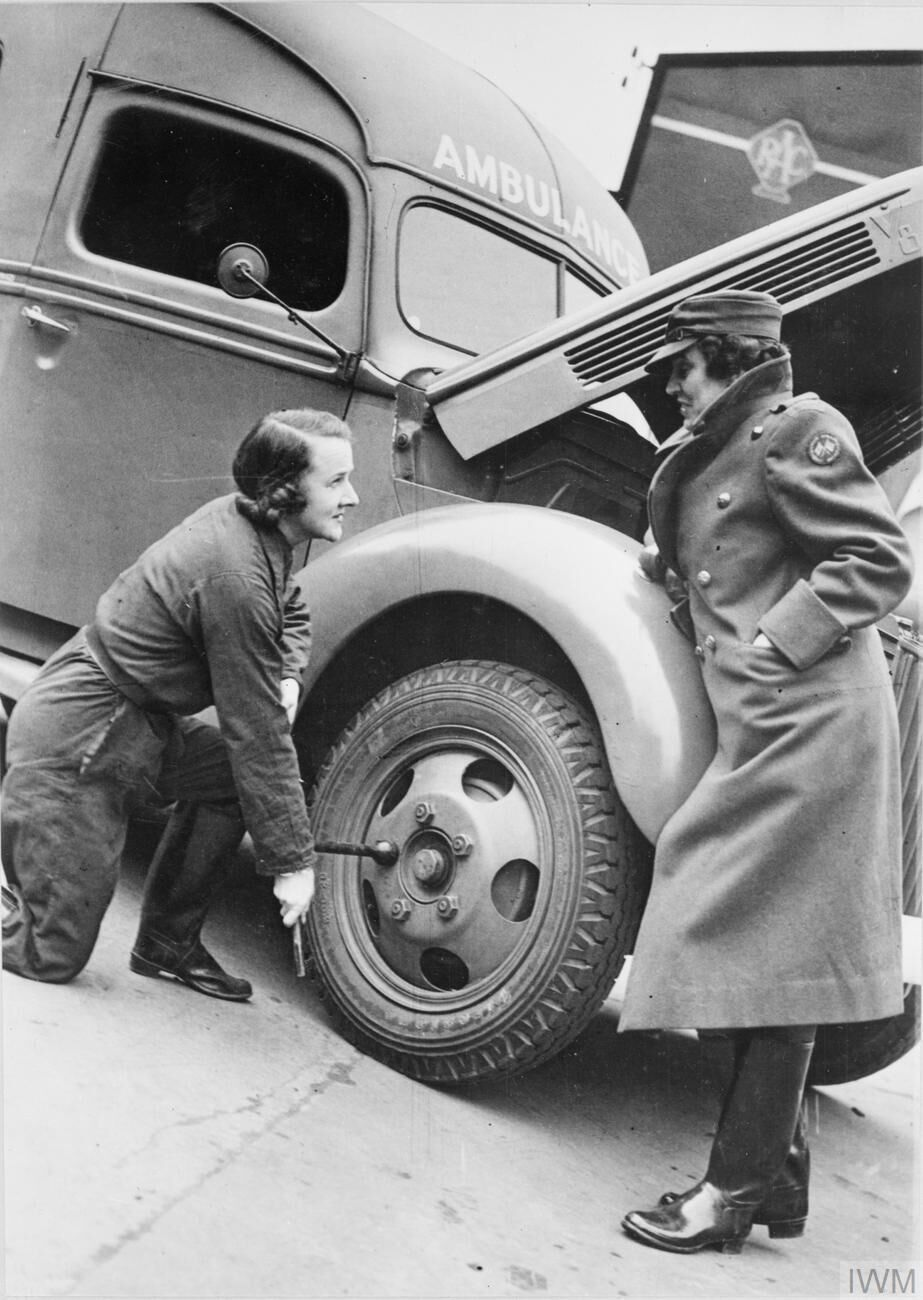
An ambulance driver using a lug wrench, 1940

A lug wrench, also colloquially known as a tire iron, is the name for a type of socket wrench used to loosen and tighten lug nuts on automobile wheels. In the United Kingdom and Australia, it is commonly known as a wheel brace.

== Forms ==
Lug wrenches may be L-shaped, or X-shaped. The form commonly found in car trunks is an L-shaped metal rod with a socket wrench on the bent end and a prying tip on the other end. The prying tip is mainly intended to remove hub caps or wheel covers that may be covering a wheel's lug nuts.

Another common type, sometimes called a spider wrench, is made in the shape of a cross with different sized sockets on each of the four ends. Other names are four way wheel wrench, spanner, brace, or cross.

== Technique ==
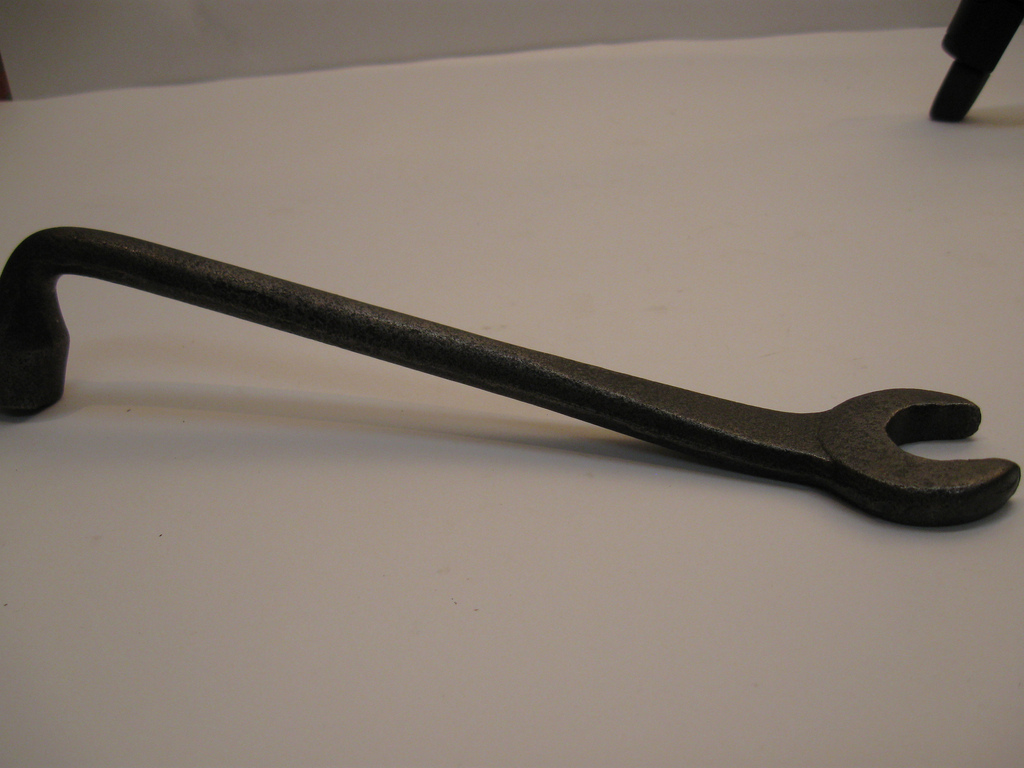
A lug wrench

Ideally, the nuts (or bolts) should be tightened with a torque wrench. Lug wrenches are much less expensive because they lack the ability to measure or limit the force used. Installing a wheel with a lug wrench thus requires a bit of rough guessing about proper tightness. Excessive force can strip threads or make the nuts very difficult to remove. Also, uneven torque between the various lug nuts, or excessive torque, can lead to warping of the brake rotor if the car is equipped with disc brakes. For this reason, impact wrenches should properly be used only for removing lug nuts, not for tightening them, although in practice this rule is often ignored for convenience's sake, even by professional mechanics.

When re-fitting a wheel, the nuts (or bolts) should be tightened in a criss-cross pattern (to even out the forces) and initially should only be tightened "finger tight" on all nuts. In this context "finger tight" is tight enough to reach the point where free play is taken up and proper tightening is about to begin, say, the tightening force using the lug wrench/wheel brace like a screwdriver. This should be repeated twice, to ensure the wheel is properly centered and restrained by all nuts (as often the first nut that is tightened will be slightly loose after completing the set for the first time), then the wheel should be lowered to the ground and the criss-cross tightening pattern repeated to modest torque (say few fingers force on the lug wrench/wheel brace arm), and then finally repeated to full hand force.

Rarely, and more often with large trucks and lorries, insufficient force can lead to the nuts coming undone while in use. Because of this, it is best to use a torque wrench or similar tool to finally tighten the wheel lug nuts to the proper torque specification as soon as possible after using a lug wrench to affix a wheel. At the very least, the lug nuts should be checked for tightness after 50–100 km/miles when things have been subject to some vibration and thermal cycling.

This tool also has a secondary usage: it can be used to remove vehicles that are stuck in the snow by breaking up ice so it can be easily shovelled away from the drive wheels.
