= Hydraulic torque wrench =

Power tool designed to exert torque on a fastener

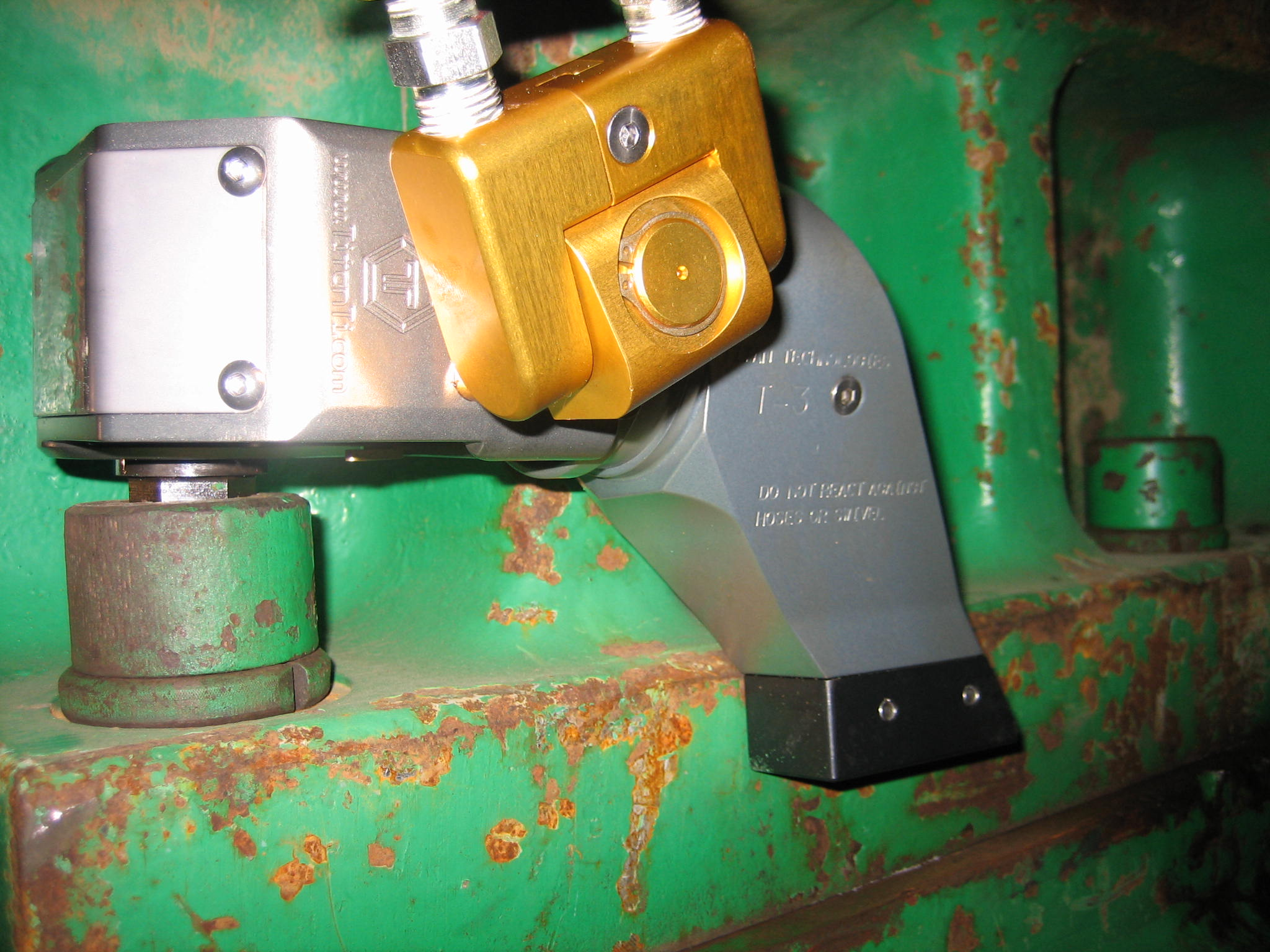
Vibratory hammer bolting with a hydraulic torque wrench.

Flange bolting with hydraulic torque wrench.

A hydraulic torque wrench is a power tool designed to exert torque on a fastener to achieve proper tightening or loosening of a connection through the use of hydraulics. A torque wrench is applied to the nut either directly or in conjunction with an impact socket. Hydraulic torque wrenches apply a predetermined, controlled amount of torque to a properly lubricated fastener.

The hydraulic torque wrench was invented in early 1970s. The concept of a hydraulic powered torque wrench was first introduced on the market sometime in the early 1960s in a primitive form, and several key advances have been developed by manufacturers since that time which provided major advancements in the technology and usability of the tools far beyond the original concept tool.

Newer tools offer benefits such as lighter weights, smaller nose radius dimensions for fitting into tight spaces, use of exotic alloys, actuation triggers on the tool itself, multi-position reaction members, 360° × 360° hose swivels, and the ability to run multiple tools simultaneously from a single power pack.

There are two types of hydraulic torque wrenches: square drive and low profile. Depending on the application, one or the other will be the best tool to use.

The main characteristics of a hydraulic torque wrench which set it apart from other powered wrenches of similar function are that (1) it must generate torque using only hydraulic means (2) it must be self ratcheting, and (3) it must include an accurate method of determining the amount of torque applied.

In 1985, the Research Council on Structural Connections specification permitted the use of the calibrated wrench method of installation, but with a clearer statement of the requirements of the method and its limitations.

In the calibrated wrench method the wrench is calibrated or adjusted to shut off when the desired torque is reached. The hydraulic ones do not have a standard calibration procedure, but the practice follows the manual torque standards ASME B107.14-2004, ISO 6789:2003, or similar ones.

Some manufacturers utilize a holding pawl design to keep the wrench locked in position prior to each power stroke, while others use varying designs, which have different faults and advantages.

Hydraulic torque wrenches typically offer accuracy of ±1-3% and have a high degree of repeatability making them well suited to applications where large bolts are involved and a high degree of accuracy is required.

A hydraulic torque wrench is significantly quieter, lighter weight and more accurate than pneumatic impact wrenches capable of similar torque output, making it an appealing alternative for many users to the very loud and cumbersome impact wrenches or torque multipliers which were formerly the only viable option for working with very large nuts and bolts until the hydraulic torque wrench was introduced.

Hydraulic bolt tensioners are an alternative to hydraulic torque wrenches, but not as commonly used.

== Sources ==
- Raether, William (December 2001). "Torque talk". Engineering and Mining Journal. 202 (12). Jacksonville: 35–38.
- Brown, Warren; Hamilton, Scott; Nguyen, An; Smith, Tom (2011-01-01). "Field Calibration and Accuracy of Torque Wrenches". Volume 3: Design and Analysis. ASMEDC. pp. 89–95. doi:10.1115/pvp2011-57414. ISBN 978-0-7918-4453-3.
