= RCSC =

RCSC may refer to:

- Roman Catholic Syrian Christian (RCSC): a colloquial name for members of the Syro-Malabar Catholic Church; an Eastern Catholic church based in Kerala, India.
- Red Cliffs Secondary College (RCSC) a public co-educational high school based in Red Cliffs, Victoria, Australia.
- Royal Canadian Sea Cadets (RCSC) - a Canadian national youth program sponsored by the Canadian Armed Forces and the civilian Navy League of Canada.
- Royal Charleroi Sporting Club (RCSC) is a Belgian football club based in the city of Charleroi, in the province of Hainaut.
- Research Council on Structural Connections (RCSC) is a US research organization focused on bolted structural connections.
