= Power bar =

Power bar may refer to

- Power strip, an electronic device used to plug in other devices to power them
- Powerbar, a brand of energy bars made by an American company of the same name
- Power bar, an alternative name for a breaker bar
- Health meter, a video game mechanic
