= Spin disk =

Socket wrench accessory

A spin disk is a socket wrench accessory used to quickly turn nuts after they have been loosened with the wrench.

Spin disks are usually a flat round disk, commonly of plastic, with a square hole in the middle to fit over the socket wrench's male adapter plug. The edges are grooved for a solid grip.

Using the spin disk will be much quicker than using the socket wrench's handle, especially if its range of motion is limited. If the nut is very loose, just using ones fingers may be the best option.

Since this accessory can easily be lost or fall off during use, many manufacturers forgo the spinner accessory in favor of grooving placed directly on the sockets themselves to aid finger operation.
