= Power wrench =

A power wrench is type of wrench that is powered by other means than human force. A typical power source is compressed air. There are two main types of power wrenches: impact wrenches and air ratchet wrenches or pneumatic ratchet wrenches.

== Air ratchet wrench ==
An air ratchet wrench is very similar to hand-powered ratchet wrenches in that it has the same square drive, but an air motor is attached to turn the socket drive. Pulling the trigger activates the motor which turns the socket drive. A switch is provided to change which direction the socket drive turns.

This type of power wrench is designed more for speed and less for torque. If high levels of torque are desired an impact wrench should be used.
