= Torque multiplier =

Tool to increase the application of torque

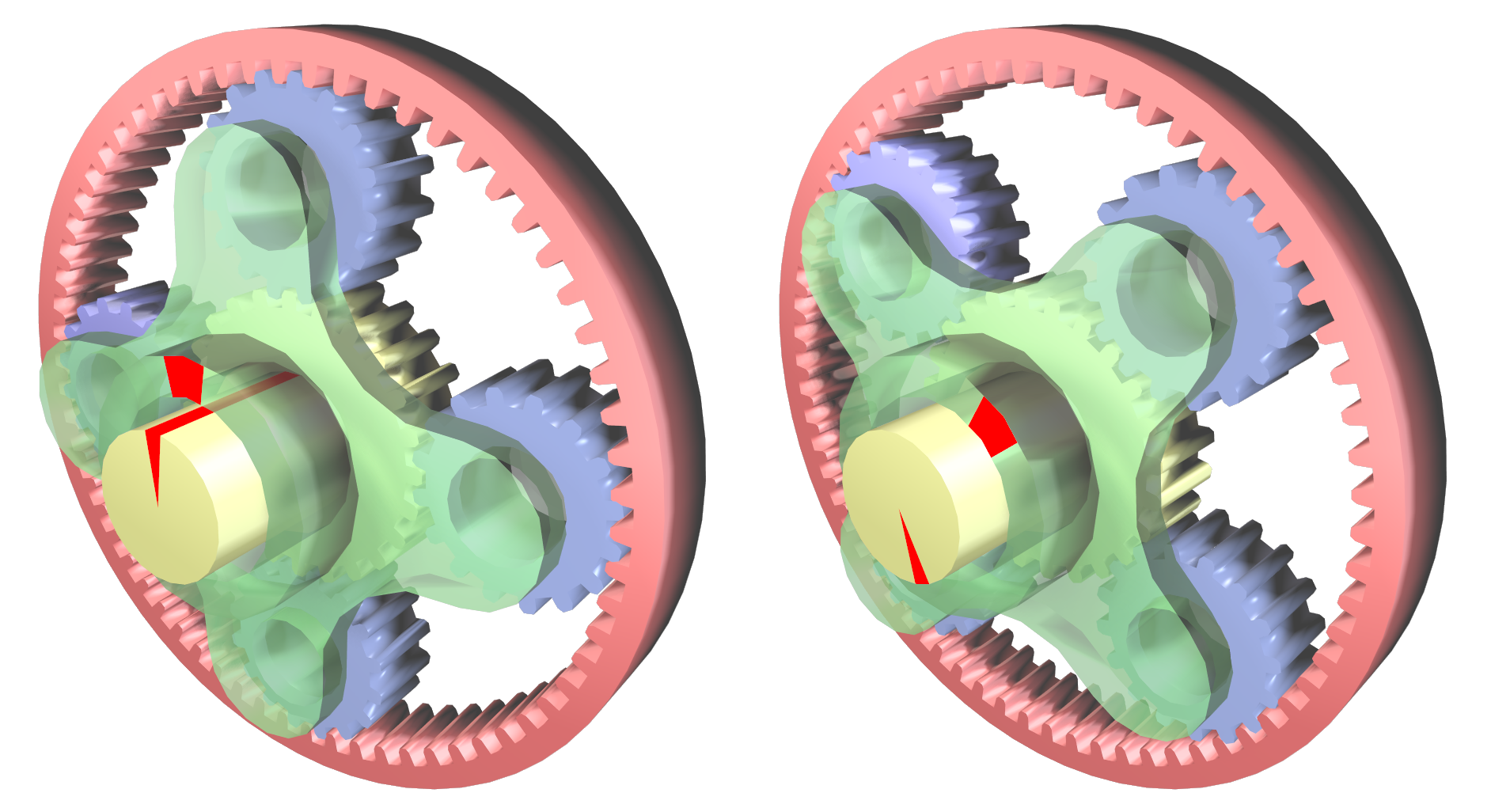
Epicyclic gearing can be used in a torque multiplier. The sun gear (yellow) is driven by an input torque. The planet gear carrier (green) provides the output torque, while the ring gear (red) is fixed. Note the red marks both before and after the input drive (yellow) is rotated 170° clockwise.

A torque multiplier is a tool used to provide a mechanical advantage in applying torque to turn bolts, nuts or other items designed to be actuated by application of torque, particularly where there are relatively high torque requirements.

== Description ==
Torque multipliers are often used instead of extended handles, often called "cheater bars". Extended handles use leverage instead of gear reduction to achieve torque. This torque is transmitted through the driving tool and could become dangerous in the case of a sudden catastrophic failure of the drive tool with the extended handle attached. Torque multipliers only have a fraction of the final torque pressure on the drive tool making them a safer choice.

Torque multipliers typically employ an epicyclic gear train having one or more stages. Each stage of gearing multiplies the torque applied. In epicyclic gear systems, torque is applied to the input gear or ‘sun’ gear. A number of planet gears are arranged around and engaged with this sun gear, and therefore rotate. The outside casing of the multiplier is also engaged with the planet gear teeth, but is prevented from rotating by means of a reaction arm, causing the planet gears to orbit around the sun gear. The planet gears are held in a ‘planet carrier' which also holds the output drive shaft. As the planet gears orbit around the sun gear, the carrier and the output shaft rotate together. Without the reaction arm to prevent rotation of the outer casing, the output shaft cannot apply torque.

Along with the multiplication of torque, there is a decrease in rotational speed of the output shaft compared to the input shaft. This decrease in speed is inversely proportional to the increase in torque. For example, a torque multiplier with a rating of 3:1 will turn its output shaft with three times the torque, but at one third the speed, of the input shaft. However, due to friction and other inefficiencies in the mechanism, the output torque is slightly lower than the theoretical output.

== Applications ==
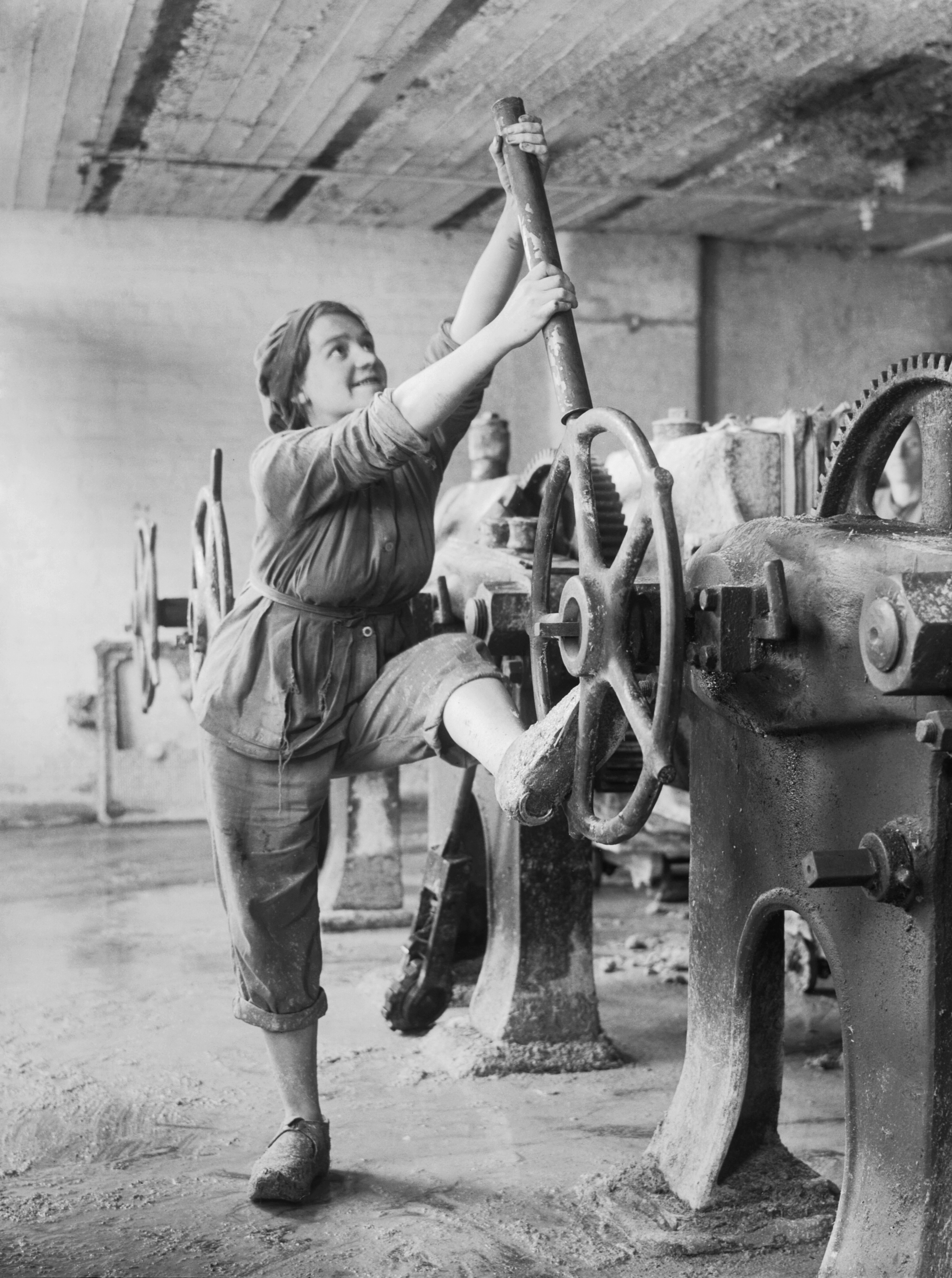
A factory worker uses a cheater bar for additional torque, September 1918

Torque multipliers are most often used when a compressed air powered impact wrench is unavailable due to remote locations without power, or where cost considerations require manually operated tools which do not require any power supply or power source of any kind. There are many instances where screws, bolts and other fasteners are secured so tightly that using a typical lug wrench with a cheater bar is not sufficient to loosen them. These include automotive repair, product assembly, construction projects, heavy equipment maintenance and other instances where high torque output is needed. A torque multiplier allows the user to generate high torque output without the use of an air compressor or impact gun.

A torque multiplier is generally used when there are space limitations that disallow the use of long handles. They are also used as a safer alternative to a cheater bar as lever length and operator effort are both reduced. Finally, torque multipliers allow for more accurate torque. By reducing the amount of effort needed to tighten, a torque multiplier allows for slow and smooth application, ensuring more accurate torque levels, and preventing damage to sensitive components.
