= Breaker bar =

Industrial handtool

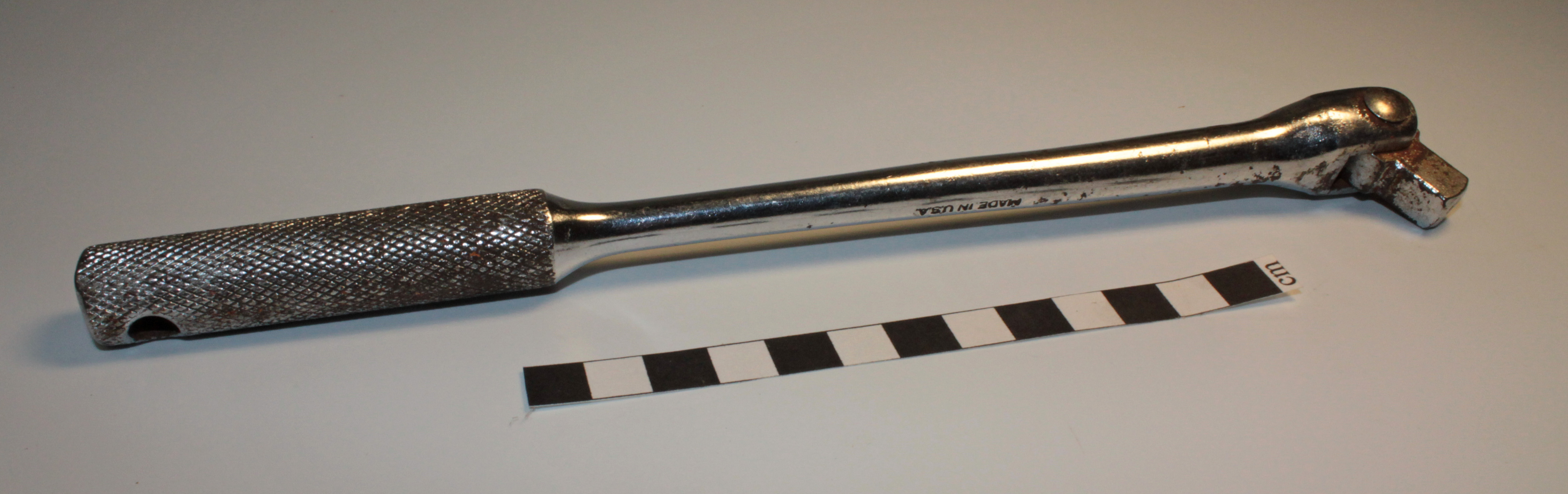
Breaker bar

A breaker bar (also known as a power bar) is a long non-ratcheting bar that is used with socket wrench-style sockets. They are used to break loose very tight fasteners because their additional length allows the same amount of force to generate significantly more torque than a standard length socket wrench. Their use prevents damage to the ratcheting mechanism of a socket wrench. Often, after the first half turn, the fastener is loose enough to be turned with a socket wrench.

== Function ==
The long handle on breaker bars compared to shorter wrenches allows a larger torque to be generated with the same amount of force. It is effectively a lever, one of the simple machines. Also, the absence of a ratcheting mechanism makes a breaker bar considerably stronger than a ratchet. This allows greater torque to be applied to a fastener without the tool failing. A breaker bar can be improvised by inserting a wrench into a length of metal pipe to increase the available torque by using the pipe to extend the effective length of the breaker bar. A pipe used for this purpose is called a cheater bar or snipe.

== Materials ==
A breaker bar is able to create a larger amount of rotational force compared to a standard socket wrench. A standard breaker bar is strong enough to allow the user to apply up to 2,500 pound-feet (3,400 N⋅m) of torque without breaking the bar. A high-end 1/2" socket wrench can withstand a maximum of 500 pound-feet (680 N⋅m) of torque. Since the breaker bar creates and withstands a larger amount of torque it is often used in place of a standard socket wrench to break loose tight-fitting fasteners. To be able to create these high torque numbers breaker bars have to be made out of a metal of adequate strength properties.

High-quality breaker bars are typically made of chromium-vanadium steel (AISI 6150). Chromium-vanadium steel is known for its high strength, excellent toughness, and shock resistance. Chromium vanadium steel has a yield strength at 0.2% offset of 84.0 kilo-pound per square inch (KSI). Meaning, chromium-vanadium steel can withstand up to 84 KSI before it begins to yield. If the steel is unloaded before the yield point it is elastic and the material will return to its original configuration. Because of its high yield strength and shock resistance, standard socket wrenches, and breaker bars are fashioned from this material. In addition to its high yield strength, chromium-vanadium steel provides resistance to abrasion, oxidation, and corrosion making it a viable material for the production of tools.

== Physics ==
Rotational force, also known as torque, varies depending on where the force is applied. If the force is applied closer to the object the torque is smaller than if the same amount of force is applied further from the object. A breaker bar creates a larger force due to the amount of torque that can be applied through a longer handle versus a shorter one. A lever arm, also known as a moment arm, is an important factor to consider when measuring the torque of a breaker bar. Having a longer lever arm creates a larger surface area for the force to be applied, which increases rotational force. Surface area is the measure of the total amount of area an object occupies. When the radius of the moment arm is increased, the surface area is proportionally increased.

The concept that torque is related to a larger moment arm is shown in the torque equation. The torque equation can be written as follows: 𝜏 (Torque) = F (Force) x r (Radius). Since the force applied is multiplied by the radius of the moment arm, having a larger radius subsequently creates a larger torque. This makes the torque value on the point of rotation much greater as the size of the handle or moment arm increases.
