= Research Council on Structural Connections =

Research organization in the United States

- Abbreviation: RCSC
- Formation: 1947
- Volunteers: 85
- Website: boltcouncil.org

The Research Council on Structural Connections (RCSC) is a research organization focused on bolted structural connections. Their technical standard on this subject is cited in the US steel design code.

Prior to 1980, the organization was known as the Research Council on Riveted and Bolted Structural Joints (RCRBSJ). It was formed in 1947 to develop specifications for connections with high-strength bolts. At that time, high-strength structural steel rivets were common in buildings and bridges, but bolts were expected to be safer, quicker, and more economical if technical equivalence could be demonstrated. The council's first Specification identified ASTM A325 bolts as one-to-one replacements for ASTM A141 rivets.
