= Impact wrench =

Socket wrench power tool

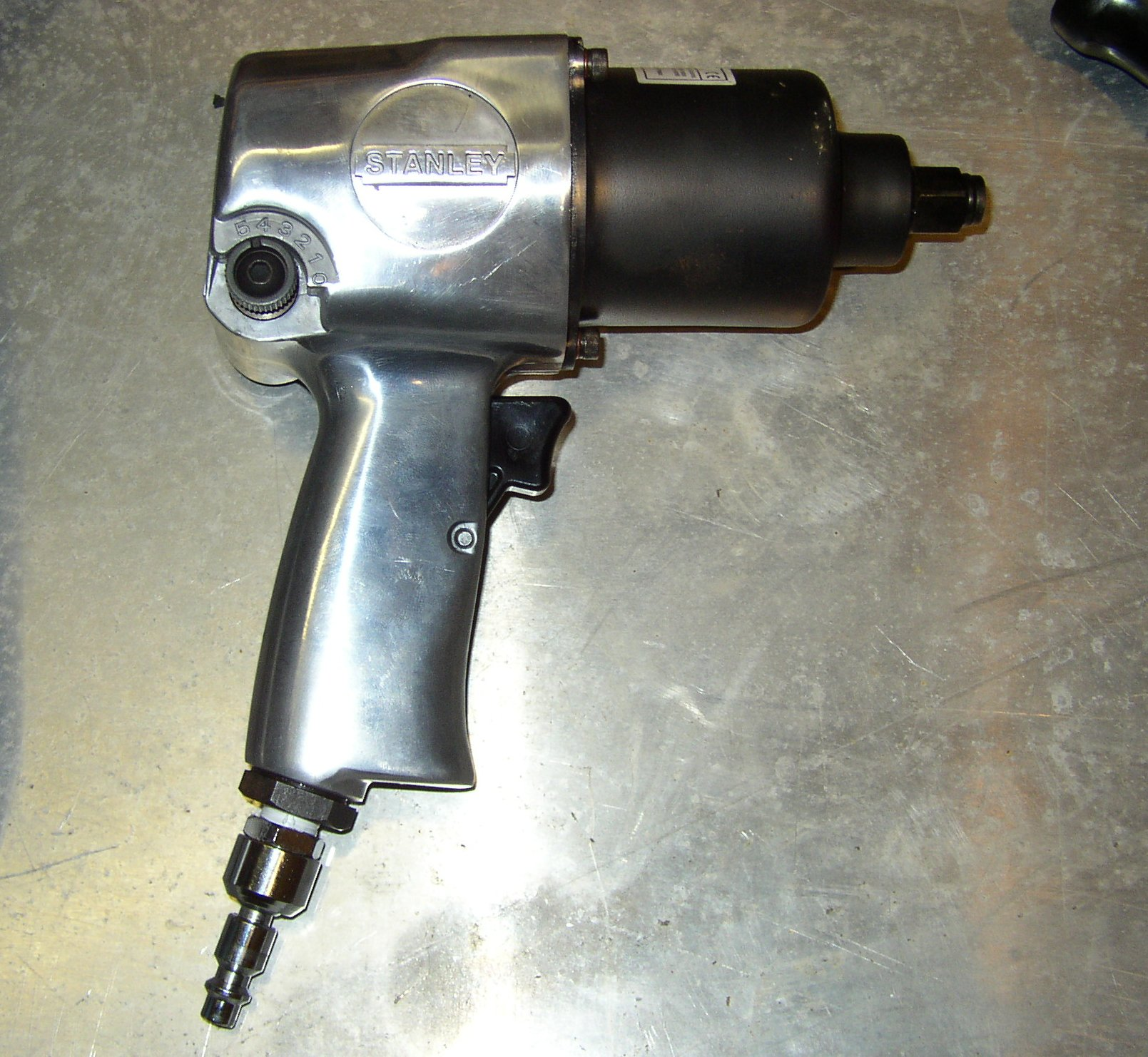
A 1/2" drive pistol-grip air impact wrench

An impact wrench is a socket wrench power tool designed to deliver high torque output with minimal exertion by the user, by storing angular momentum in a rotating mass, then delivering it suddenly to the output shaft. In operation, a rotating mass is accelerated by the motor, storing angular momentum, then suddenly connected to the output shaft (the anvil), creating a high-torque impact.

Compressed air is the most common power source, although electric or hydraulic power is also used, with cordless electric devices becoming increasingly popular since the mid-2000s.

Impact wrenches are widely used in many industries, such as automotive repair, heavy equipment maintenance, product assembly, major construction projects, and any other instance where a high torque output is needed. For product assembly, a pulse tool is commonly used, as it features a reactionless tightening while reducing the noise levels the regular impacts suffer from. Pulse tools use oil as a medium to transfer the angular momentum from the hammer into the anvil. This gives a smoother impulse, a slightly lower torque to weight ratio and a possibility to design a shut off mechanism that shuts the tool down when achieving the correct torque. Pulse tools are not referred to as "impact wrenches" as the performance and technology are not the same.

Impact wrenches are available in every standard socket wrench drive size, from small 1/4 in (6.4 mm) drive tools for small assembly and disassembly, up to 3 1/2 in (89 mm) and larger square drives for major construction.

== History ==
The impact wrench was invented by Robert H. Pott of Evansville, Indiana, patented in 1935.

== Mechanism ==
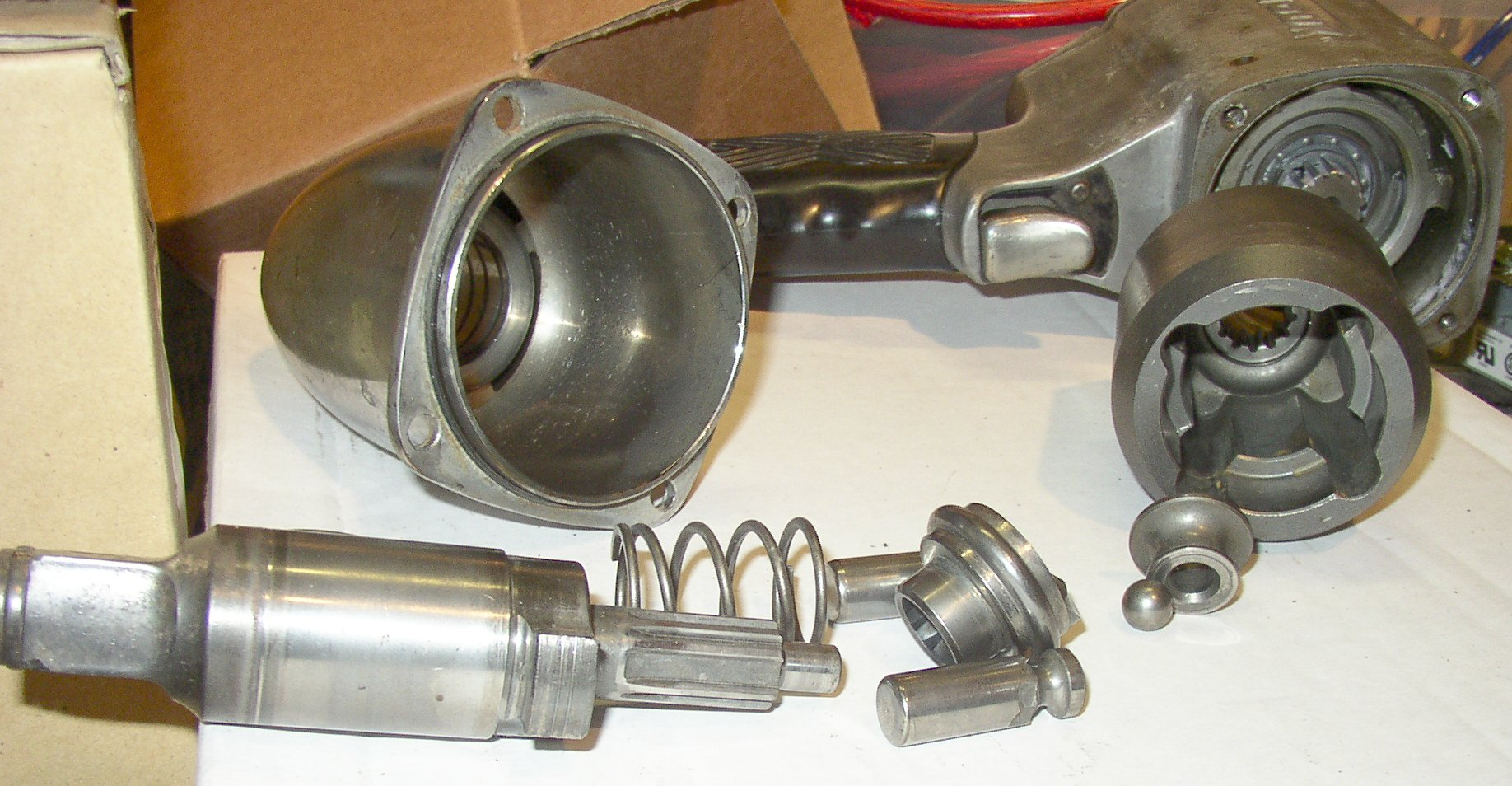
The pin clutch mechanism from a 3/4 in (19 mm) drive impact wrench.

An animation of a pin clutch hammer. Normally the hammer rotates while the anvil remains stationary attached to the fastener, but rotating the anvil more clearly demonstrates the action of the pins.

The hammer mechanism in an impact wrench needs to allow the hammer to spin freely, impact the anvil, then release and spin freely again. Many designs are used to accomplish this task, all with some drawbacks. Depending on the design, the hammer may drive the anvil either once or twice per revolution (where a revolution is the difference between the hammer and the anvil), with some designs delivering faster, weaker blows twice per revolution, or slower, more powerful ones only once per revolution.

The mechanism is designed such that after delivering the impact, the hammer is again allowed to spin freely, and does not stay locked. With this design, the only reaction force applied to the body of the tool is the motor accelerating the hammer, and thus the operator feels very little torque, even though a very high peak torque is delivered to the socket. This is similar to a conventional hammer, where the user applies a small, constant force to swing the hammer, which generates a very large impulse when the hammer strikes an object. The hammer design requires a certain minimum torque before the hammer is allowed to spin separately from the anvil, causing the tool to stop hammering and instead smoothly drive the fastener if only low torque is needed, rapidly installing/removing the fastener.

A common hammer design called a ball and cam mechanism has the hammer able to slide and rotate on a shaft, with a spring holding it in the downwards position. Between the hammer and the driving shaft is a steel ball on a ramp, such that if the input shaft rotates ahead of the hammer with enough torque, the spring is compressed and the hammer is slid backwards. On the bottom of the hammer, and the top of the anvil, are dog teeth, designed for high impacts. When the tool is used, the hammer rotates until its dog teeth contact the teeth on the anvil, stopping the hammer from rotating. The input shaft continues to turn, causing the ramp to lift the steel ball, lifting the hammer assembly until the dog teeth no longer engage the anvil, and the hammer is free to spin again. The hammer then springs forward to the bottom of the ball ramp, and is accelerated by the input shaft, until the dog teeth contact the anvil again, delivering the impact. The process then repeats, delivering blows every time the teeth meet, almost always twice per revolution, although impact tools with three impact dogs have been produced. If the output has little load on it, such as when spinning a loose nut on a bolt, the torque will never be high enough to cause the ball to compress the spring, and the input will smoothly drive the output in the same manner as a drill or powered screwdriver. The ball and cam impact mechanism is most commonly seen in electric impact tools, as it allows the power source to be continuously rotating even while impacting, which prevents the motor from stalling. This design has the advantage of small size and simplicity, but energy is wasted moving the entire hammer back and forth, and delivering multiple blows per revolution gives less time for the hammer to accelerate, making this design less efficient than the pin clutch or counterweight mechanisms seen in pneumatic impact tools. This design is often seen after a gear reduction, which reduces the speed and increases the torque of the motor driving the impact mechanism, and compensates for the lack of acceleration time by delivering more torque at a lower speed.

Another common design uses a hammer fixed directly onto the input shaft, with a pair of pins acting as clutches. When the hammer rotates past the anvil, a ball ramp pushes the pins outwards against a spring, extending them to where they will hit the anvil and deliver the impact, then release and spring back into the hammer, usually by having the balls "fall off" the other side of the ramp at the instant the hammer hits. Since the ramp need only have one peak around the shaft, and the engagement of the hammer with the anvil is not based on a number of teeth between them, this design allows the hammer to accelerate for a full revolution before contacting the anvil, giving it more time to accelerate and delivering a stronger impact. The disadvantages are that the sliding pins must handle very high impacts, and often cause the early failure of tool.

Yet another design uses a rocking weight inside the hammer, and a single, long protrusion on the side of the anvil's shaft. When the hammer spins, the rocking weight first contacts the anvil on the opposite side to that used to drive the anvil, nudging the weight into position for the impact. As the hammer spins further, the weight hits the side of the anvil, transferring the hammer's and its own momentum to the output, then rocks back to the other side. This design also has the advantage of hammering only once per revolution, as well as its simplicity, but has the disadvantage of making the tool vibrate as the rocking weight acts as an eccentric, and can be less tolerant of running the tool with low input power. To help combat the vibration and uneven drive, sometimes two of these hammers are placed in line with each other, at 180° offsets, both striking at the same time.

A new (as of 2016) design encases the pounding mechanism in hydraulic fluid to reduce the amount of metal to metal contact, greatly reducing noise and vibration.

As the output of an impact wrench, when hammering, is a very short impact force, the actual effective torque is difficult to measure, with several different ratings in use. As the tool delivers a fixed amount of angular momentum with each blow, rather than a fixed torque, the actual output torque changes with the duration of the output pulse. If the output is springy or capable of absorbing energy, the impulse will simply be absorbed, and virtually no torque will be applied, and somewhat counter-intuitively, if the object is very springy, the wrench may actually turn backwards as the energy is delivered back to the anvil, while it is not connected to the hammer and able to spin freely. A wrench that is capable of freeing a rusted nut on a very large bolt may be incapable of turning a small screw mounted on a spring. "Maximum torque" is the number most often given by manufacturers, which is the instantaneous peak torque delivered if the anvil is locked into a perfectly solid object. "Working torque" is a more realistic number for continually driving a very stiff fastener, and is typically measured by driving on a Skidmore-Wilhelm torque tension test device for 5-10 seconds. "Nut-busting torque" is often quoted in impact tool specifications, with the usual definition being that the wrench can loosen a nut tightened with the specified amount of torque in some specified time period. Accurately controlling the output torque of an impact wrench is very difficult, and even an experienced operator will have a hard time making sure a fastener is not under-tightened or over-tightened using an impact wrench. Special socket extensions are available, commonly marketed as torque sticks or torque extensions which take advantage of the inability of an impact wrench to work against a spring, to precisely limit the output torque. Designed with spring steel, they act as large torsion springs, flexing at their torque rating, and preventing any further torque from being applied to the fastener. Some impact wrenches designed for product assembly have a built-in torque control system, such as a built-in torsion spring and a mechanism that shuts the tool down when the given torque is exceeded. When very precise torque is required, an impact wrench is only used to snug down the fastener, with a torque wrench used for the final tightening. Due to the lack of consistent standards when measuring torque outputs, some manufacturers are believed to inflate their ratings, or to use measurements with little bearing on how the tool will perform in actual use. Many air impact wrenches incorporate a flow regulator into their design, either as a separate control or part of the reversing valve, allowing torque to be roughly limited in one or both directions, while electric tools may use a variable speed trigger for the same effect.

An impact wrench typically delivers more torque and accepts larger tool bits than an impact driver. This makes the impact wrench more suitable for large bolts and nuts in heavy mechanical settings (like for instance lug nuts), while the impact driver with its lesser torque and smaller tool bit is more suited towards driving smaller screws, like for instance in construction work.

== Design ==
=== Power source ===
Compressed air is the most common power source for impact wrenches, providing a low-cost design with the best power-to-weight ratio. A normal vane motor is almost always used, usually with four to seven vanes, and various lubrication systems, the most common of which uses oiled air, while others may include special oil passages routed to the parts that need it and a separate, sealed oil system for the hammer assembly. Most impact wrenches drive the hammer directly from the motor, giving it fast action when the fastener requires only low torque. Other designs use a gear reduction system before the hammer mechanism, most often a single-stage planetary gearset usually with a heavier hammer, delivering a more constant speed and higher "spin" torque. Electric impact wrenches are available being either mains powered, or 12-, 18- or 24-volt DC-powered (typically for automotive use). Recently, cordless electric impact wrenches have become common. While their power outputs were initially significantly lower than corded electric or air-powered impact wrenches, the introduction of brushless DC motors and lithium-ion batteries have made cordless impact tools as or even more powerful than air or corded impact wrenches of 1/4- to 1-inch drive sizes, with cordless impacts rarely produced above 1-inch drive sizes. A ratcheting impact wrench is also a type of impact wrench with a locking mechanism that locks in place when it's turned the required number of revolutions. The locking mechanism prevents the tool from being turned by hand. These tools have a torque range of 200-300 lbs. Some industrial tools are hydraulically powered, using high-speed hydraulic motors, and are used in some heavy equipment repair shops, large construction sites, and other areas where a suitable hydraulic supply is available. Hydraulic impact wrenches have the advantage of high power-to-weight ratio.

=== Sizes and styles ===
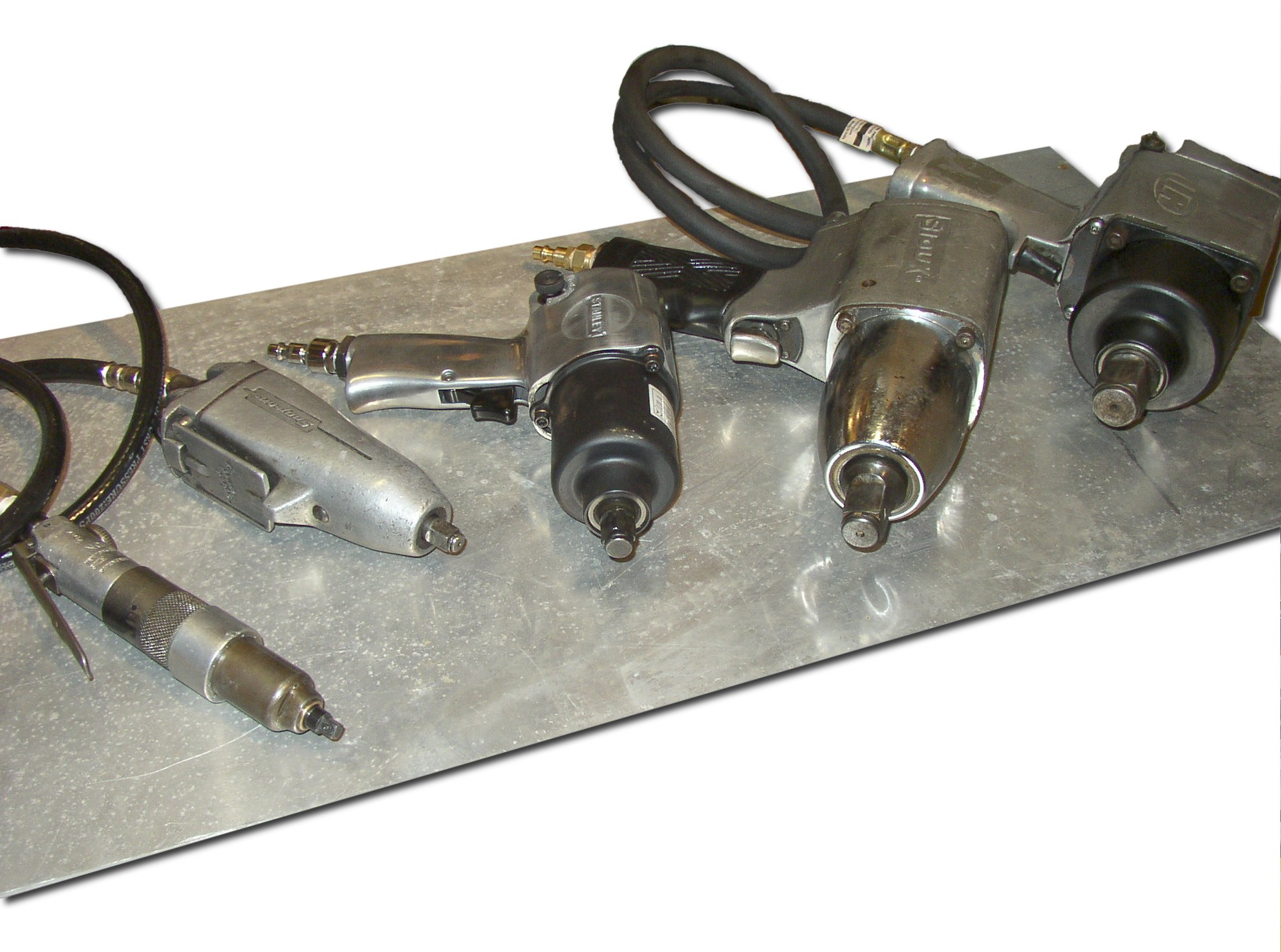
A variety of impact wrenches, in all common sizes from 1/4 to 1 in (6.4 to 25.4 mm), of different styles, including inline, butterfly, and pistol grip.

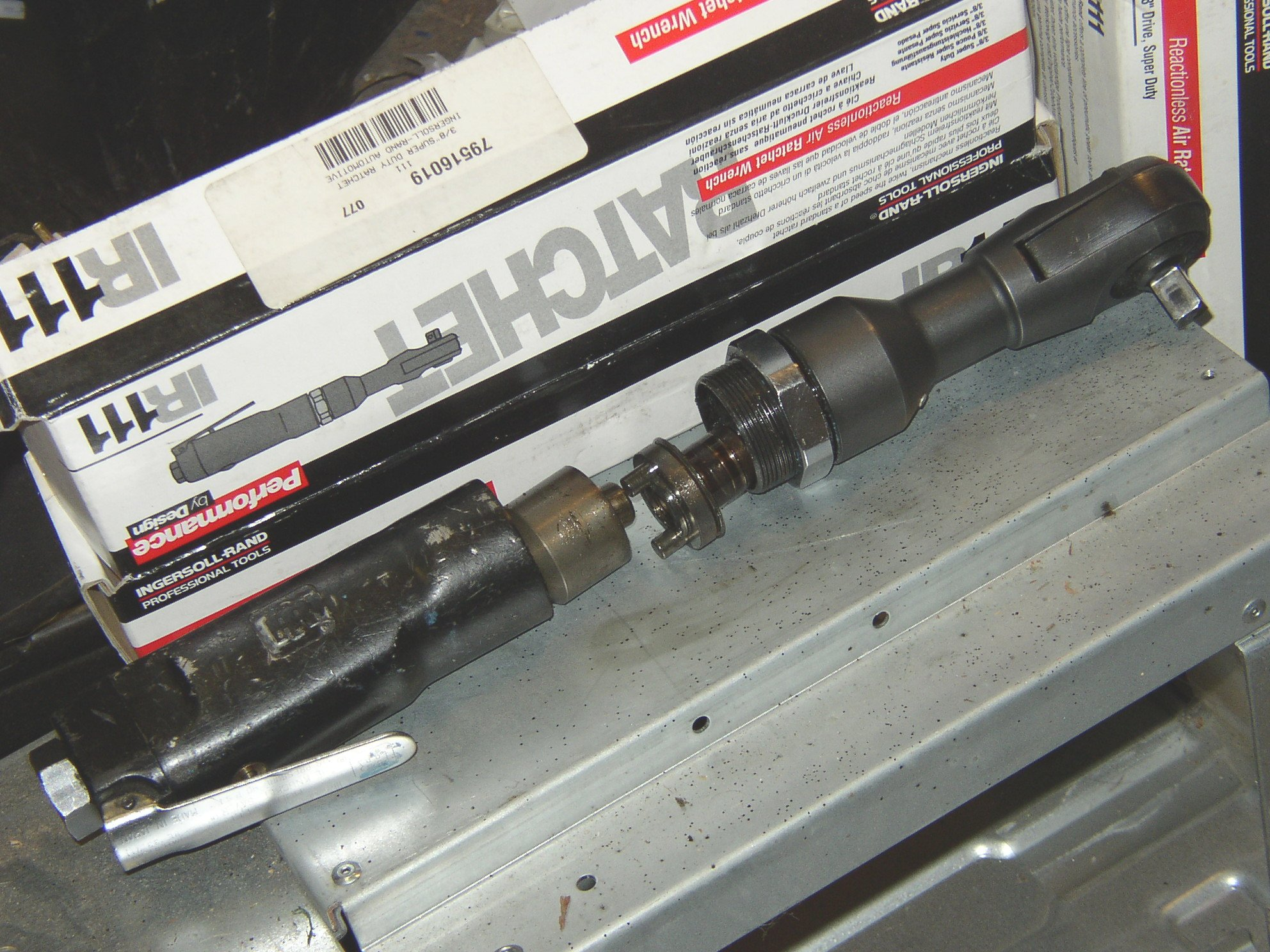
This "reactionless" ratchet uses a miniature pin clutch impact mechanism instead of a gear reduction.

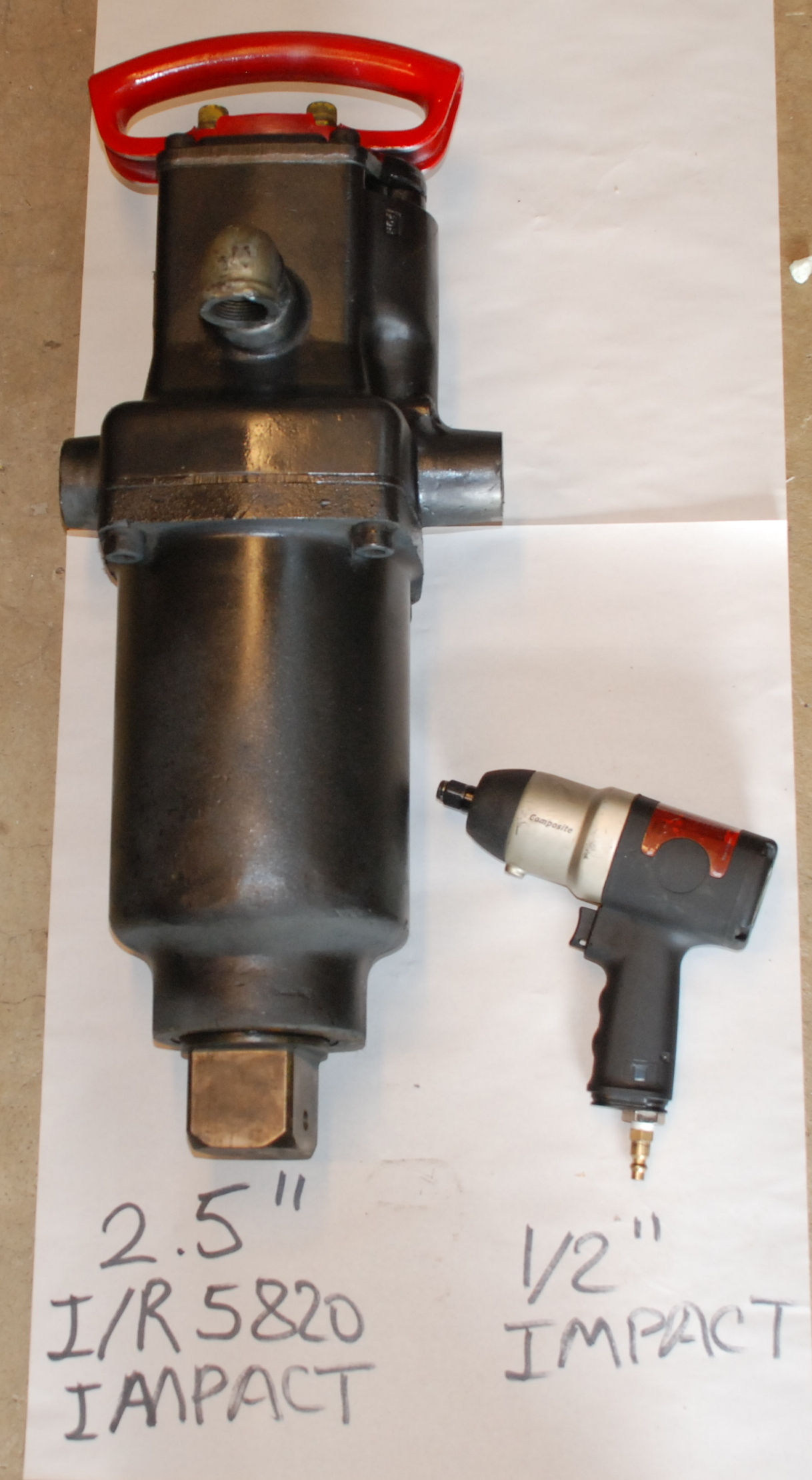
Large 2 1/2 in (64 mm) Drive Ingersoll Rand impact vs 1/2 in (13 mm) impact wrench.

Impact wrenches are available in all sizes and in several styles, depending on the application. 1/4 in (6.4 mm) drive wrenches are commonly available in both inline (the user holds the tool like a screwdriver, with the output on the end) and pistol grip (the user holds a handle which is at right angles to the output) forms, and less commonly in an angle drive, which is similar to an inline tool but with a set of bevel gears to rotate the output 90°. 3/8 in (9.5 mm) impacts are most commonly available in pistol grip form and a special inline form known as a "butterfly" wrench, which has a large, flat throttle paddle on the side of the tool which may be tilted to one side or the other to control the direction of rotation, rather than using a separate reversing control, and shaped to allow access into tight areas. Regular inline and angle 3/8 in (9.5 mm) drive impact wrenches are uncommon, but available. 1/2 in (13 mm) drive units are virtually only available in pistol grip form, with any inline type being virtually impossible to obtain, due to the increased torque transmitted back to the user and the greater weight of the tool requiring the larger handle. 3/4 in (19 mm) drive impact wrenches are again essentially only available in pistol grip form. 1 in (25 mm) drive tools are available in both pistol grip and "D handle" inline, where the back of the tool has an enclosed handle for the user to hold. Both forms often also incorporate a side handle, allowing both hands to hold the tool at once. 1 1/4 in (32 mm) and larger wrenches are usually available in "T handle" form, with two large handles on either side of the tool body, allowing for maximum torque to be applied to the user, and giving the best control of the tool. Very large impact wrenches (up to several hundred thousand foot-pounds of torque) usually incorporate eyelets in their design, allowing them to be suspended from a crane, lift, or other device, since their weight is often more than a person can move. A recent design combines an impact wrench and an air ratchet, often called a "reactionless air ratchet" by the manufacturers, incorporating an impact assembly before the ratchet assembly. Such a design allows very high output torques with minimal effort on the operator, and prevents the common injury of slamming one's knuckles into some part of the equipment when the fastener tightens down and the torque suddenly increases. Specialty designs are available for certain applications, such as removing crankshaft pulleys without removing the radiator in a vehicle.

Various methods are used to attach the socket or accessory to the anvil, such as a spring-loaded pin that snaps into a matching hole in the socket, preventing the socket being removed until an object is used to depress the pin, a hog ring which holds the socket by friction or by snapping into indents machined into the socket, and a through-hole, where a pin is inserted completely through the socket and anvil, locking the socket on. Hog rings are used on most smaller tools, with through-hole used only on larger impact wrenches, typically 3/4 in (19 mm) drive or greater. Pin retainers used to be more common, but seem to be being replaced by hog rings on most tools, despite the lack of a positive lock. 1/4 in (6.4 mm) female hex drive is becoming increasingly popular for small impact wrenches, especially cordless electric versions, allowing them to fit standard screwdriver tips rather than sockets. Adapter attachments can be purchased that allow hex drive tools to couple to square drive sockets, and vice versa.

Many users choose to equip their air-powered impact wrenches with a short length of air hose rather than attaching an air fitting directly to the tool. Such a hose greatly aids in fitting the wrench into tight areas, by not having the complete coupler assembly sticking out the back of the tool, as well as making it easier for the user to position the tool. An additional benefit is greatly reduced wear on the coupler, by isolating it from the vibration of the tool. A short length of hose also prevents the air fitting from being broken off in the base of the tool if the user loses their grip and the tool is allowed to spin.

=== Sockets and accessories ===
Sockets and extensions for impact wrenches are made of high tensile metal, as any spring effect will greatly reduce the torque available at the fastener. Even so, the use of multiple extensions, universal joints, and so forth will weaken the impacts, and the operator needs to minimize their use. Using non-impact sockets or accessories with an impact wrench will often result in bending, fracturing, or otherwise damaging the accessory, as most are not capable of withstanding the sudden high torque of an impact tool, and can result in stripping the head on the fastener. Non-impact sockets and accessories are made of a harder more brittle metal, usually chromium–vanadium steel (often called "chrome"). Safety glasses should always be worn when working with impact tools, as the strong impacts can generate high-speed shrapnel if a socket, accessory, or fastener fails.

== See also ==
- Air tool – Tool driven by compressed air supplied by an air compressor
- Hydraulic torque wrench – Power tool designed to exert torque on a fastener
- Pneumatic torque wrench – Tool used to apply a specific torque
- Socket wrench – Lever with interchangeable socket heads to grip or turn a bolt or nut
- Torque multiplier – Tool to increase the application of torque
