= Socket wrench =

Lever with interchangeable socket heads to grip or turn a bolt or nut

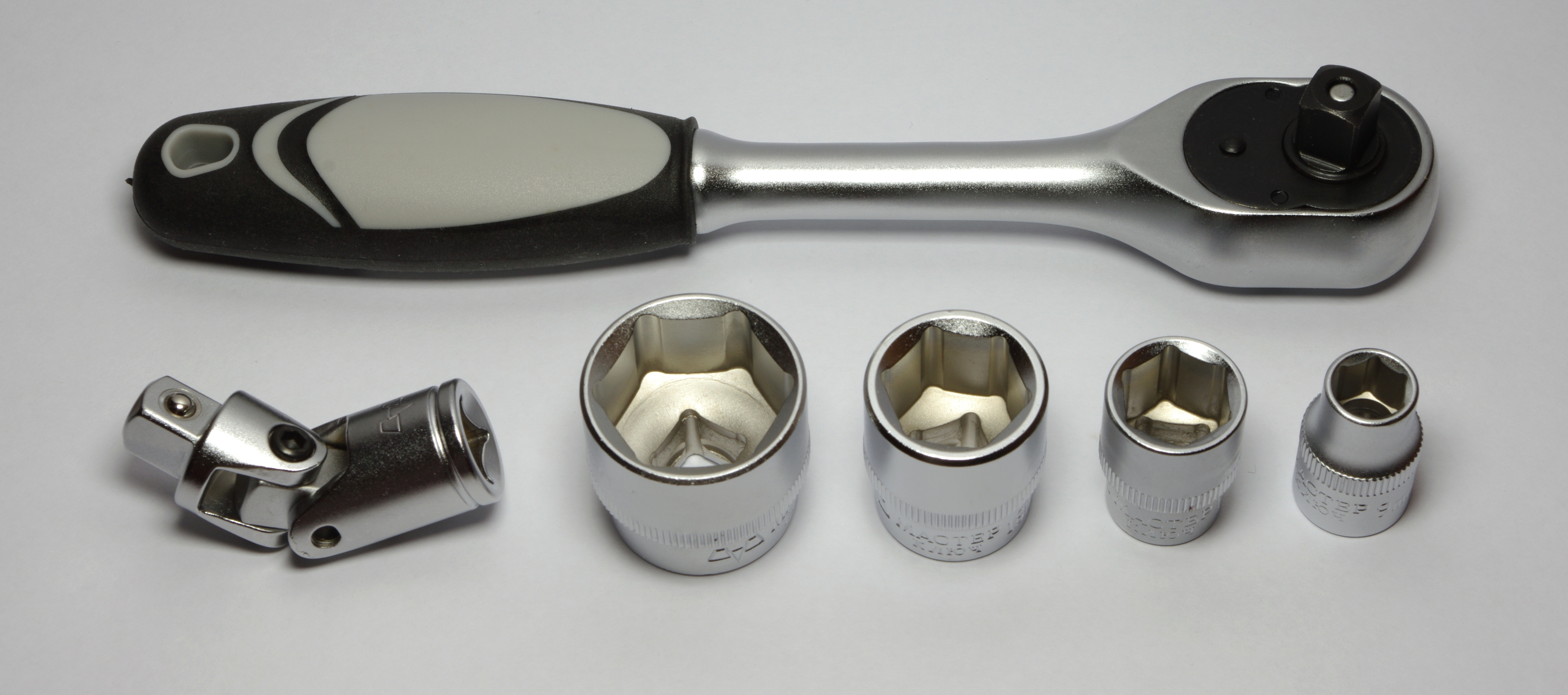
Socket set with ratchet (above), four hex sockets and a universal joint

A socket wrench (or socket spanner) is a type of spanner (or wrench in North American English) that uses a closed socket format, rather than a typical open wrench/spanner to turn a fastener, typically in the form of a nut or bolt.

The most prevalent form is the ratcheting socket wrench, often called a ratchet. A ratchet incorporates a reversible ratcheting mechanism which allows the user to pivot the tool back and forth to turn its socket instead of removing and repositioning a wrench to do so.

Other common methods of driving sockets include pneumatic impact wrenches, hydraulic torque wrenches, torque multipliers and breaker bars. Some lesser known hybrid drivers include striking wrench tools with square drive, and hydraulic impact wrenches (typically powered by on site hydraulic power such as present with military tanks, and many rail car applications).

== Interchangeable sockets ==
The basic contemporary form of socket is hexagonal, referred to as "6-point" for the pointed intersections where its six solid sided facets meet.

Male drivers are also produced for use with socket head cap screws, and are often called Allen drivers (trademark) or the generic term male bit drivers.

The principal advantage of interchangeable sockets is that, instead of a separate wrench for each of the many different fastener sizes and types, only separate sockets are needed for each size and type. Because of their versatility, nearly all screw and bolt types now have sockets of different types made to fit their bolts or nuts. Sockets often come as a "socket set" with many different sizes or types of sockets to fit the heads of different-sized fasteners. A ratchet of the "set size" is often included with the socket set. Sockets are commonly available in fractional inch and metric sizes, and in short (shallow) and longer (deep) varieties.

=== Square drive ===
The interchangeable sockets are attached to the driving tool via a male/female square connection fitting (called the square drive). Standard sizes of square drives around the world include 1/4, 3/8, 1/2, 5/8, 3/4, 1, 1 1/2, 2 1/2 and 3 1/2 in (6.4, 9.5, 12.7, 15.9, 19.1, 25.4, 38.1, 63.5 and 88.9 mm) square drive sizes (dimensions up to 1 1/2 inches are standardized in ANSI B5.38-1958, a de facto international standard with no metric equivalents). 5/8-inch square drive is less popular, as are No. 4 and No. 5 spline drives specified in ANSI B107. 1/4, 3/8 in (6.4, 9.5 mm), and 1/2 in (13 mm) sizes are the most commonly found variants. This wide range of square drive sizes provides for a wide variety of socket types and sizes to suit small to very large nuts and bolts. Some square drivers have a through hole to attach the socket to the driver (using a retaining ring with O-ring and pin type, or single piece molded retaining rings), a locking pin, or friction ball. Some common hand ratchets employ a quick release button on their top for quick socket release of smaller sockets. The tool chosen to drive the socket wrench ultimately supplies the mechanical advantage needed by the user to provide the torque needed to loosen or tighten the fastener as may be required. Larger drivers are typically used with higher torque, while smaller drivers are used for convenience in smaller low torque applications. Given the limits of human strength and fatigue, torque above 800 N⋅m (600 lbf⋅ft) of torque will generally involve some kind of power assist, instead of the user simply pushing on the handle of a wrench. Very large sockets and drivers are typically powered by hydraulics to achieve torque.

== History ==
Wrenches in the form of sockets—that is, a female driver to envelop the male head of a fastener—have existed for centuries. Early examples include the keys used to wind clocks since the Middle Ages. The heads and sockets were typically square; hex heads eventually became more common starting in the 20th century. The ratcheting socket wrench, with interchangeable (indexable) sockets, was invented by an American, J.J. Richardson, of Woodstock, Vermont. The tool was patented (U.S. patent 38,914) through the Scientific American Patent Agency on June 16, 1863. The first illustration of the tool appears on p. 248 of the April 16, 1864 issue of Scientific American. In current American English usage, the term "socket wrench" describes the wrench, not the socket. However, the term "socket wrench" is not used in British English.

Square heads and sockets were the easiest to make in the era when hand filing was the typical method of manufacture. With the proliferation of modern manufacturing methods it became just as easy to make hex heads and sockets as square ones. The hex form allows easier wrenching in confined surroundings (where nearby obstacles obstruct the swing of the wrench), because fewer degrees of arc are needed on each swing before it is possible to reposition the wrench onto the next set of flats. Ratchet wrenches further reduce this problem, as the wrench need only swing as many degrees as it takes for the ratchet pawl to catch the next tooth.

The quick release feature common to ratchets was invented and patented in 1964 (U.S. patent 3,208,318) by Peter M. Roberts.

== Related tools ==
=== Fixed socket ===
Image	Name	Description
	lug wrench wheel brace	A non-ratcheting socket wrench where the socket is attached permanently to the end of a L-shaped, or X-shaped bar. They are designed as special use socket wrenches for loosening and tightening lug nuts on automobile or truck wheels.
	nut driver	A screwdriver-type handle for hand turning with a built-in female socket at the end of either metric or fractional inch sizes. May be of different lengths.
	flex-head socket wrench Saltus wrench	Combination wrenches with a fixed socket in place of the box end.
	T-handle	A socket attached to a T-handle that is used for leverage. The socket may be fixed or sliding.
	tuning wrench	Used to tune some musical instruments' strings.
	spark plug wrench tube spanner box spanner	A tube with six-sided sockets on both ends. It is turned with a short length of rod (Tommy bar or T-bar) inserted through two holes in the middle of the tube. Often used in situations where a common-sized fastener is recessed deep in a blind hole with minimal radial clearances for using a standard wrench/ratchet handle, such as automotive spark plugs or plumbing/tap hardware.

=== Interchangeable socket ===
==== Ratcheting ====
Image	Name	Description
	ratcheting socket wrench	The most common type of socket wrench. The ratcheting mechanism allows the nut to be tightened or loosened with a reciprocating motion, without requiring that the wrench be removed and refitted after each turn. Typically, a small lever on the ratchet head switches the wrench between tightening and loosening mode. These drive fittings come in four common sizes: 1/4 inch, 3/8 inch, 1/2 inch, and 3/4 inch (referred to as "drives", as in "3/8 drive"). Despite being denominated in inches, these are trade names (common product name), and manufacturers construct them to 6.3 mm, 9.5 mm, 12.5 mm and 19 mm, having been rounded to a reasonable, if haphazard, metric value. Larger drive sizes such as 1 inch and above are usually only encountered on fasteners of larger industrial equipment, such as tractor-trailers (articulated lorries), large cargo aircraft and passenger airliners, and marine work (merchant fleets, navies, shipyards). The sockets themselves come in a full range of inch and metric sizes. ("SAE" is often used as a blanket term for the nonmetric sizes, despite the technical inaccuracy of that usage.) The advantages of the system of a ratchet wrench with indexable sockets are speed of wrenching (it is much faster than a conventional wrench, especially in repetitive bolt-on or bolt-off usage) and efficiency of tooling cost and portability (it is much more efficient than a set of non-ratcheting wrenches, with every size head having its own handle). Fine-tooth ratchets have finer teeth on the ratcheting components; these can be useful for tighter locations. Dual-pawl ratchets click twice for each tooth on the gear, effectively doubling the granularity of the mechanism.
	click-style torque wrench	Normally ratcheting and click when a preset torque is reached. Some torque wrenches have digital read-outs of torque. Other types of torque wrenches exist such as torque limiting that only allows a preset torque to be reached before they slip. For some applications, torque multiplying devices are used with a torque wrench.
	flex-head ratchet	Ratchets in which the drive head pivots or swivels back and forth on the handle at a pivot to the rear of the ratchet head.
	swivel-head ratchet roto-ratchet	Ratchets in which the entire ratchet head swivels with handle attachments on the side of the ratcheting head rather than the rear of the ratcheting head.
	palm ratchet	Ratchets with a knurled palm sized circular ratchet handle with reversible socket attachment useful for rapidly loosening or tightening a bolt or nut. They come in a variety of sizes.
	rotator ratchet	Allow the socket to be twisted by twisting the ratchet handle around the handle axis. Requires less than one degree arc swing to rotate socket, which makes them ideal for very tight spaces.
	gearless ratchet	A ratchet that doesn't use gears, but instead uses bearings to provide virtually no arc swing nor produces an audible or discernible click. This is not commonly used as the regular geared ratchet.

A number of other specialized ratchets—with hammer heads, multiple drive sizes, and other unusual features—are built by various manufacturers.

==== Non-ratcheting ====
Image	Name	Description
	breaker bar power bar flexible handle	A bar that attaches to a standard socket. Breaker bars are usually longer and built more sturdily than a standard ratchet handle and have a swiveling head that attaches to the socket. Breaker bars are used to break loose tight fasteners because their additional length and strength allows the same amount of force to generate significantly more torque than a standard length socket wrench. The use of a breaker bar also avoids potential damage to the ratcheting mechanism of a socket wrench. Once the fastener is "broken loose," it can be turned with a socket wrench or by hand.
	beam-style torque wrench	Usually non-ratcheting, made to attach to standard sockets. By monitoring the degree of beam deflection, the applied torque can be determined.
	speed handle speed brace	A crank-shaped handle that rapidly loosens or tightens a fastener when used with the correct socket. It works much like a brace and bit adapted to sockets.
	spinner handle socket handle	A screwdriver handle with a male drive end for attaching sockets.
	offset drive	A fixed drive where the head spins relative to the handle spinning, with the handle having a drive attachment where a ratchet or other socket wrench can be attached.

=== Powered ===
There are also power tool versions of "air" (pneumatic) ratchets which use compressed air power to drive air powered socket wrenches which tighten or loosen nuts or bolts. A second major variety of compressed air powered tools are impact wrenches which are used for common tasks such as lug nuts on wheels. Electric powered impact wrenches for the same tasks are not uncommon. Small cordless 12 volt and 18 volt impact drivers are often used today as powered ratchets to remove and install nuts and bolts. Hydraulic motor ratchets with their characteristic higher torque are rare outside heavy industry. The sockets used for impact duty (called "impact sockets") are made with thicker walls and tempered to a lower hardness so as not to shatter under the impacts of the impact tool. They are typically finished in black oxide rather than the usual chrome plating of the hand-tool variety. Standard sockets (i.e. non-impact sockets) may shatter if used with impact wrenches, presenting a safety risk.

== Socket types ==
There are two main types of sockets: impact and hand. Sockets are referred by their number of “points” for the pointed intersections of their multi-faceted interior sides. Common designs include:

- 6 point, hexagon, for hexagonal nuts.
  - Variants include designs with curved (splined) faces for off nut corner contact, to reduce chance of stripping
- 12 point (24 facets) for use with hexagonal nuts
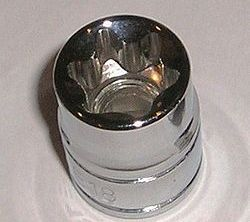
Torx socket

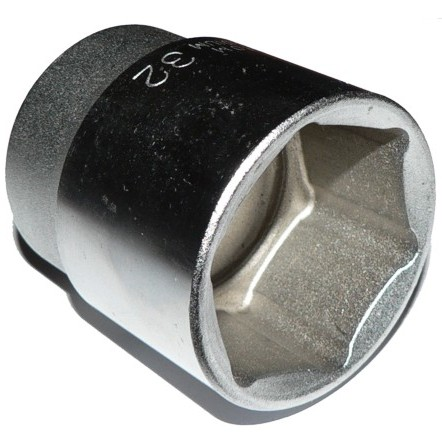
"6 point" hexagonal socket

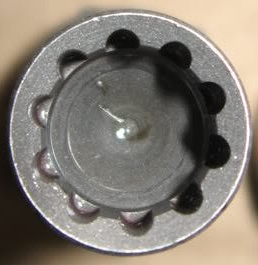
Splined socket

Less frequently used shapes include the square 4-point, triple square 12-point (not to be confused with 12-point double hexagon), octagonal 8-point (not to be confused with the more common 8-point double square shape). These less common shapes are typically found in special applications or particular industries such as aircraft, PVC plumbing fittings or German and UK made automobiles. With rail cars, valve adjustment screws and pipe plugs, the 4-point square shaped driver can still be found in wide use both male and female configurations. Nuts and bolt heads are also produced in 12-point double hexagon shapes and various types of splines, more common to aircraft and aerospace applications.

When working with common 6-point hexagonal fasteners, the 12-point shaped socket offers double the number of starting points or possible positions by which to put the socket on the nut, and so allows alignment every 30 degrees, rather than every 60 degrees of angle. Most manufacturers of sockets for larger hexagonal bolts produce them in 6-point (hexagonal) and limited sizes of 12-point (double-hexagonal) configurations.

Some specialized sockets are made with a specialized "6 flute" etc. socket that attaches to damaged bolts of both metric and fractional inch sizes for removal. Some specialized sockets are made to fit specific specialized applications and are designed and sized for that specific application. Spark plug sockets, oxygen sensor sockets, ball joint sockets, axle nut sockets, etc. fit in this category.

A much rarer form of socket is the penta socket, or 5 point socket, used with things such as, Telephone lines, waterworks, and certain vehicles. By far the most common use for them is with water meters, which have 5 sided bolts or nuts.

=== Impact sockets and drivers ===
Sockets for use with an impact wrench or impact driver are expected to receive higher torques, which is also percussive, and so need to be made of tougher materials. They are made from a thicker, tougher and more ductile alloy steel, often using CrMo steel to replace the CrV steel used in non-impact sockets. Most impact sockets made for "standard" hexagonal fasteners have a six-point design.

Chrome plated sockets are not suitable as the impact wrench may break the chrome plating, which can form razor sharp flakes - consequently impact sockets use different coatings - often a black phosphate conversion coating, or black oxide.

=== Standard-length and deep-length sockets ===
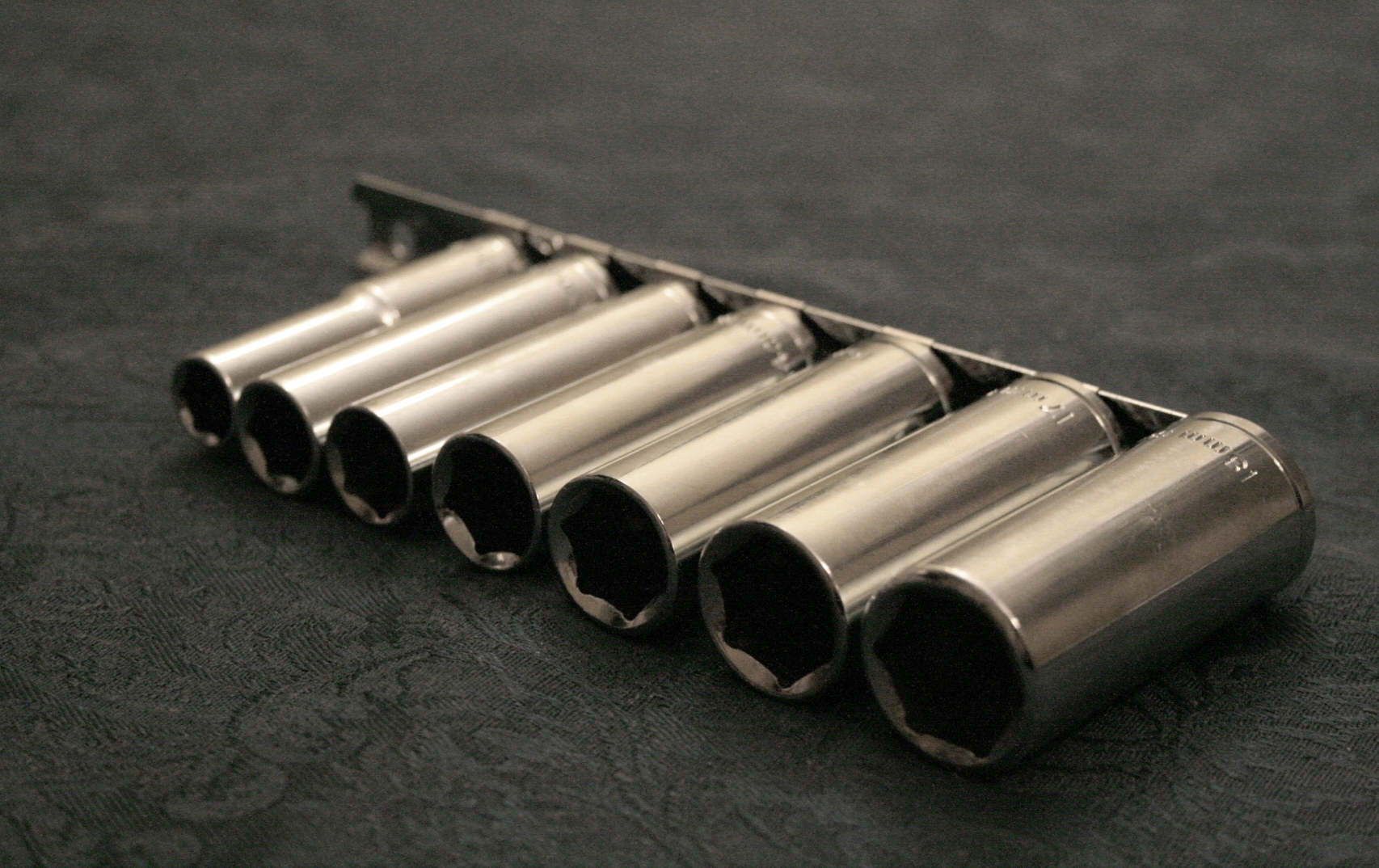
A set of deep sockets on a rail.

Sockets are available in various depths or lengths, often divided by most manufacturers into two categories of "standard" and "deep" according to the ANSI or DIN standard they are made to and the tolerances allowed by those specifications for each length of socket. Because the standards allow for some flexibility in tolerances, it is common to see two manufacturers make deep sockets of the same size but with slightly different depths even though both meet the same specification. Standard length, otherwise known as "shallow" sockets, have a lower profile and allow a user to access nuts in narrow spaces. Deep sockets are useful for turning nuts onto bolts when the bolt extends upwards into the socket (as in the case of many bolted joints), a very typical example being exhaust clamp bolts on a car. Low-profile sockets, shorter even than standard sockets, are available for some applications, typically oil filter removal on engines with limited access.

Although most manufacturers offer only those sizes and depths described within the common ANSI or DIN specifications, some exceptions do exist. Specialty manufacturers such as IMPERIAL-Newton Corp offer an expanded range of "extra deep" sockets for special industrial applications; and popular brands like Snap-on or Mac Tools offer what are called "semi-deep" or "mid-length" sockets, which provide much of a deep socket's depth, while fitting in tighter locations.

=== Pass-through sockets and ratchets ===
Some sockets are designed to have the same outside diameter and shape within a given set size. Each pass-through socket, within a given socket set, is designed to be used with a "special" ratchet that fits on the outside of the socket and not to the middle of the socket. By fitting the outside of the socket they allow the bolt or stud to extend through the socket, eliminating the need for a deep socket in some applications. By attaching to the outside of the socket they also allow the socket to be built up to 50% shorter and with 20% less width which is an advantage in some situations. Pass-through sockets and ratchets are built for 1/4-inch, 3/8-inch and 1/2-inch sets in both SAE and metric sizes. By using a fine tooth ratchet and socket system that allow a pass-through ratchet to be used as a conventional ratchet handle with interchangeable 1/4-inch and 3/8-inch drives some ratchets can be used with standard sockets. They are built by a number of manufacturers with a variety of trade names. Craftsman Tools call theirs Max Axess, and also sells GearWrench's Pass-Thru brands. Lowes calls their socket system Xtreme Access, etc.. Ratcheting box end wrenches can often be employed in the same application, but will nearly always be significantly wider.

=== Drivers ===
Male bit drivers are sometimes incorrectly referred to as "sockets", but are in fact the opposite of a socket - a socket is a female recess or opening which receives another object. Common male bit drivers of this type include Allen hex wrenches (in both metric and fractional inch sizes), Torx (T-3 through T-50) spline wrenches, 4-point (square), and 12-point (triple square) male bit drivers. Other specialized screw heads that are often installed or removed with screwdriver type handles and appropriate type tip have socket varieties that fit the various screw head types and a can be attached to a socket wrench. Conversely, for low torque situations, a "socket spinner" screwdriver handle with a socket wrench type fitting on one end can be attached to many different types of sockets, bit drivers and extensions.

== Accessories ==
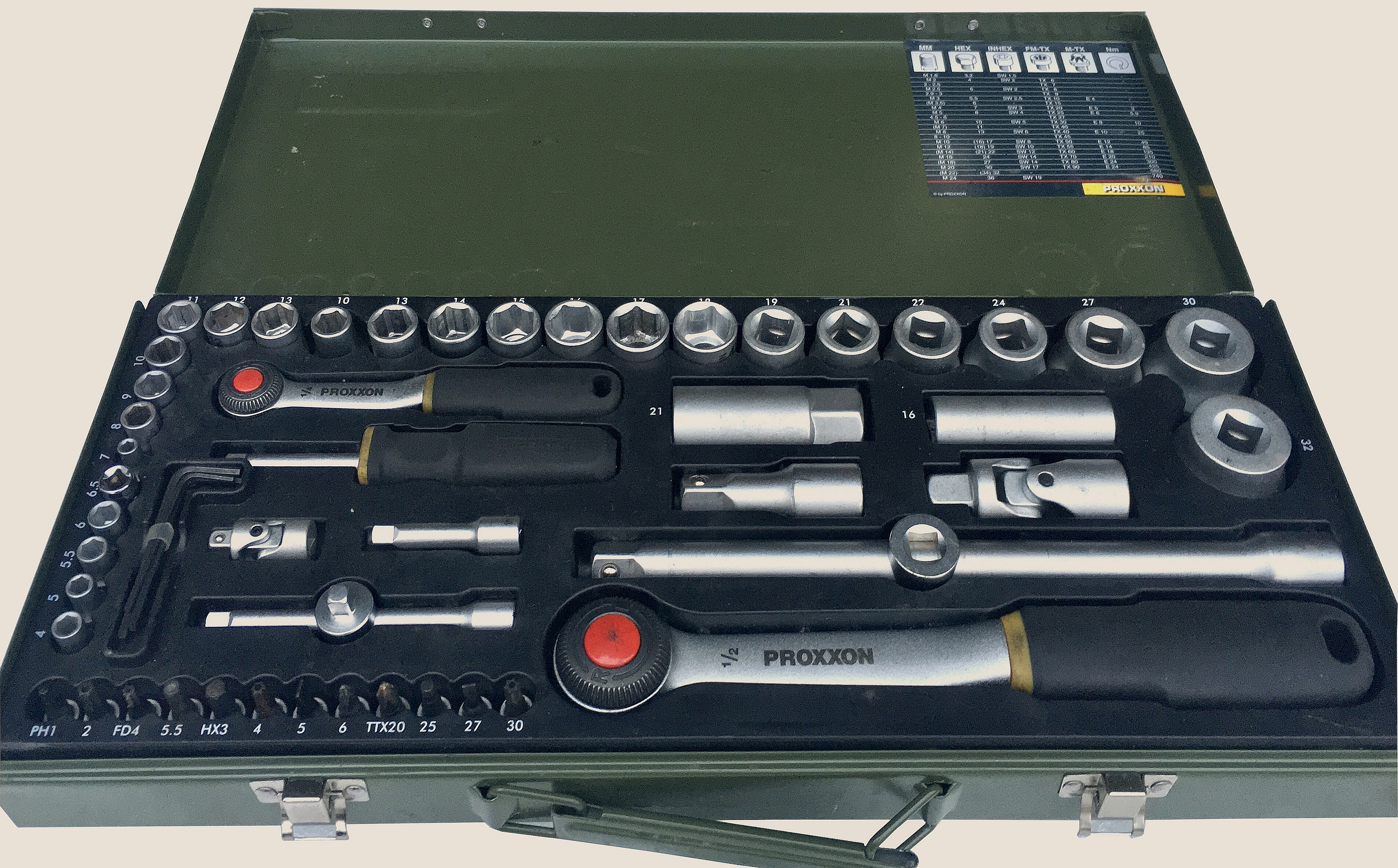
A typical professional grade socket set in a metal box. It contains two ratcheting socket wrenches (1/4-inch and 1/2-inch), various extensions for each of the wrenches, an assortment of sockets for each wrench, and a variety of bits fitting on the smaller wrench for different types of screws. The image contains annotated descriptions for each item, visible when enlarged.

These are some of the common accessories that are used with 1/4-inch, 3/8-inch, 1/2-inch (and so on) socket wrenches:

- Extensions, sometimes called "extender arms", attach to a socket on one end and a ratchet on the other end of the extension. These "extend" the length of the socket and allow access to nuts or bolts that are difficult to reach. Extensions are typically 1/2 to 20 inches (15 to 510 mm) in length in roughly 1-to-3-inch (25 to 75 mm) increments. They are sometimes attached together to get a needed length extension, and often have a knurled section for added grip.
- Wobble extensions have their socket attachment ends ground to allow the socket-extension interface to bend up to about 15 degrees. This additional flexibility often makes using a socket plus extension in a cramped location easier. A 1-to-1 1/2-inch-long (25 to 38 mm) wobble extension added to the end of any extension will convert it to a slightly longer "wobble" extension.
- Extension Grip Collars are collars with indents that fit on the back of most extensions preventing it from easily rolling away and allow one to easily grip extension and finger tighten or loosen nuts and bolts by turning extension + socket with or without ratchet.
- Ratchet spinners are short (about 1 1/2 inches (38 mm)) extensions that have a knurled attachments on them for easy hand tightening or loosening without the ratchet handle.
- Size adapters allow sockets of one drive size to be used with ratchets of another drive size. They consist of a male drive fitting of one size attached to a female drive fitting of another size. They are typically about 1 inch (25 mm) long. For example, a 1/4-inch to 3/8-inch adapter allows sockets with 1/4-inch drive holes to attach to a 3/8-inch ratchet, and so on.
- Universal joints are two articulated socket joints (about 1 inch (25 mm) long) combined at a right angle, that allow a bend in the turning axis of the wrench and socket. They are used with extensions and ratchets for turning a bolt or nut at a difficult to access location. Wobble extensions may be substituted for some universal joint applications and have the advantage of not wobbling so much.
- Crow's foot adapters, sometimes called crowfoot adapters, feature an open end similar to a spanner along with a square hole for a ratchet or breaker bar. They are used to reach otherwise inaccessible fastenings or to hold a tensioning nut at a specific torque whilst allowing access to a locking nut that would be inaccessible with a standard socket.

== See also ==
- Hydraulic torque wrench
- Impact wrench
- Torque wrench
