= Dental torque wrench =

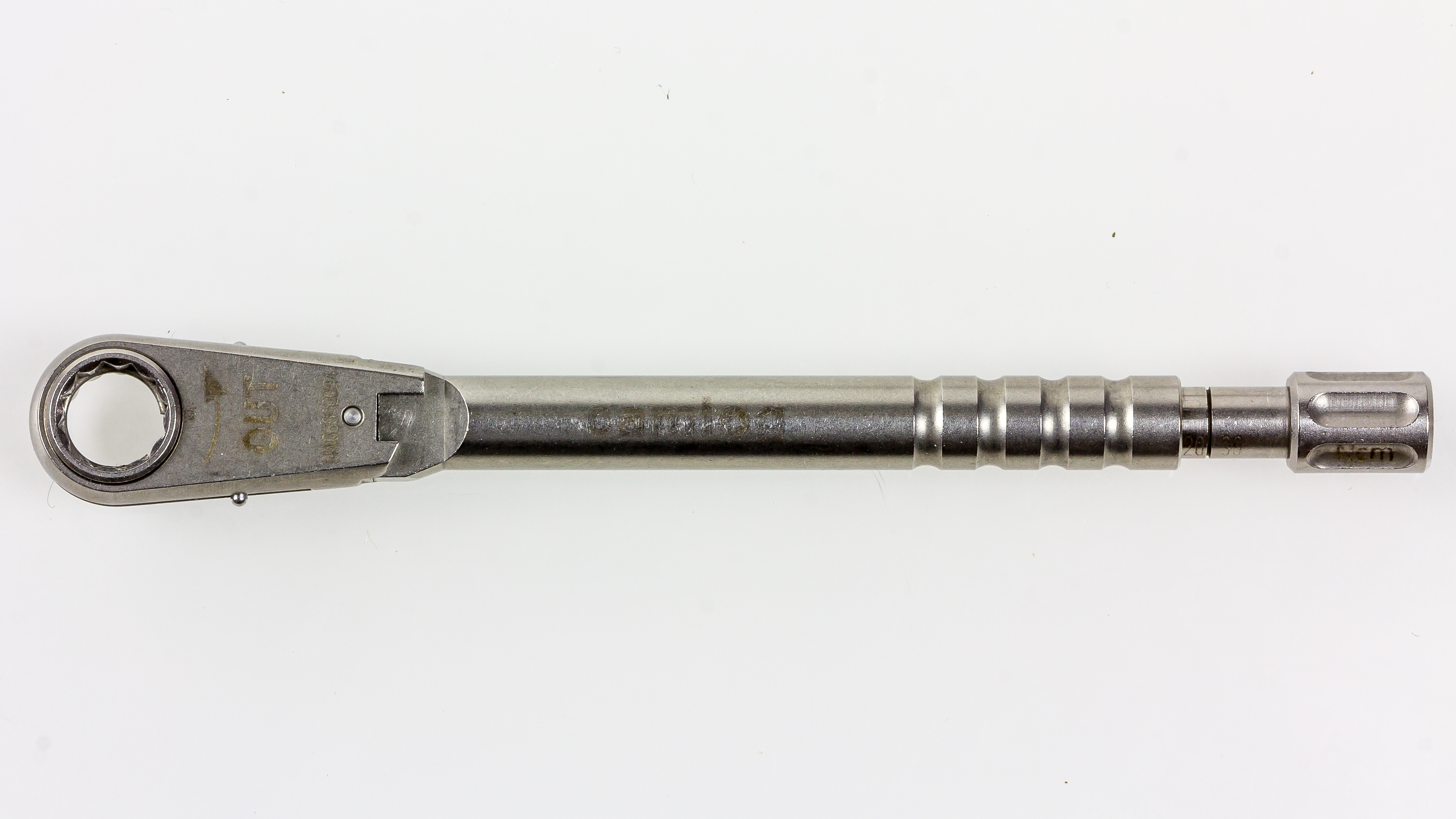
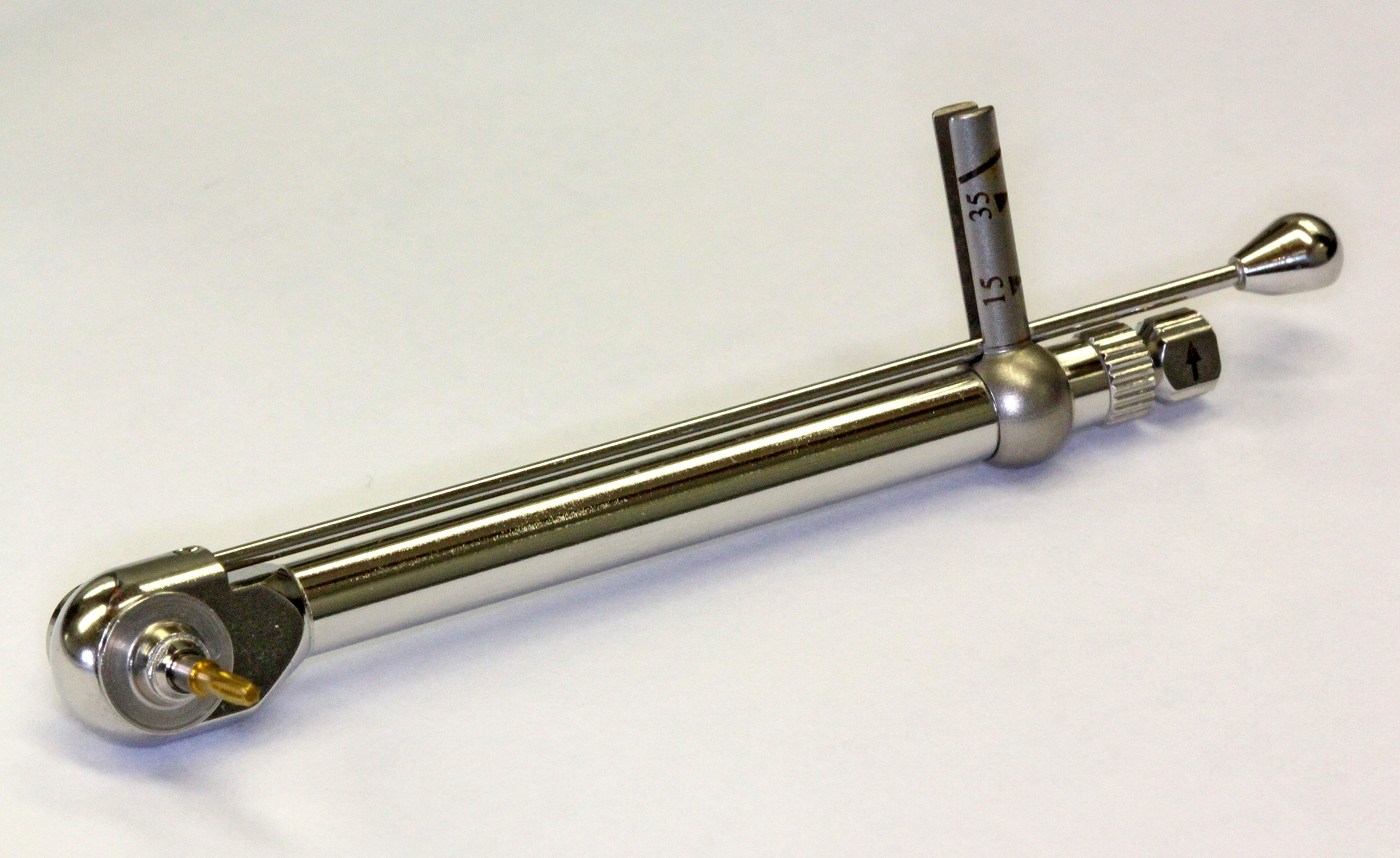
Dental torque wrenches used to secure abutment screws in dental implants (above: toggle type, 0–30 N·cm; below: beam type, 0–35 N·cm)

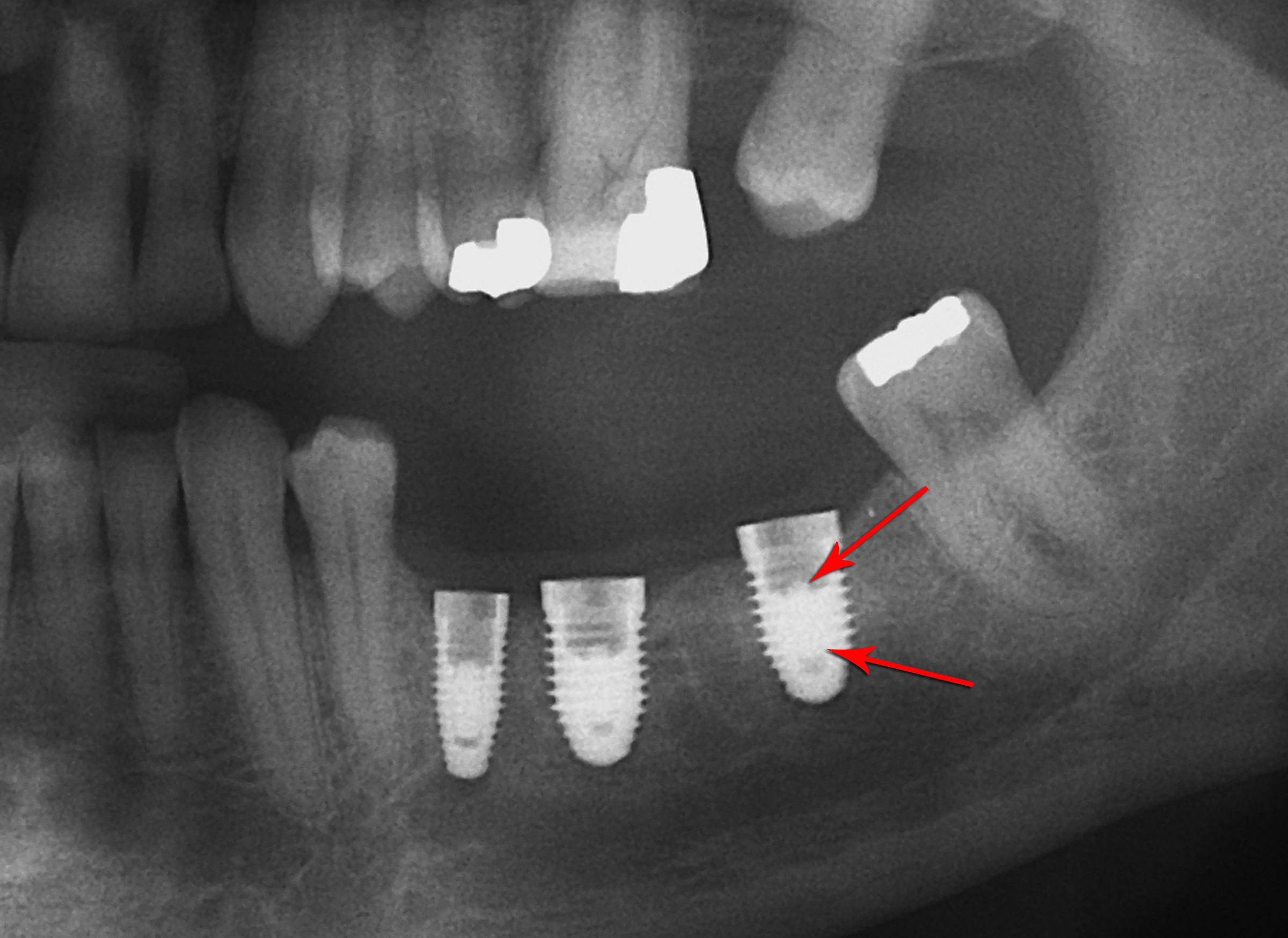
Fracture of abutment screws in 3 consecutive implants due to severe over-torquing.

A dental torque wrench or restorative torque wrench is a torque wrench used to precisely apply a specific torque to a fastener bolt for fixation of an abutment, dentures or prosthetics on a dental implant.

== Manual mechanical torque wrench ==
Toggle torque wrenches (friction-style) and beam wrenches (spring-style) are the most common types in dentistry as manual mechanical torque-limiting devices. Beam type wrenches in general are more consistent to its calibration than toggle types. The beam types with a dial indicator are the most precise to set the Tare torque (zero point reset). Because steam sterilization processes like an autoclave are applied to the dental torque wrenches and the length of time in use presents stress on the material, fatigue can occur.

== Surgical motor ==
The surgical motor is an electronic controlled torque-limiting device that also controls the speed. It is used with a twisted drill to make space in the bone for the implant or to fasten the screw (torque control can be with a torque-limiting attachment) with a screwdriver bit.

In high precision areas such as aerospace applications motor or pneumatic torque wrenches are set at a lower torque value after which the final torque is set with a manual mechanical torque wrench, they are calibrated before every use, if a wrench breaks or loses calibration every fastener done with that wrench is redone.

== Calibration ==
Various studies point to deviations of 10% and higher than the desired torque, regular recalibration with a torque tester restores the required torque values.

== Re-torquing ==
As the settling effect (the flattening of the material's micro-surface under pressure) causes a lesser torque of around 10% in a relative short time, re-torquing the fastener after 10 minutes reduces this effect as the parts get more seated.

== Wet and dry torque ==
Wet torques (bolts lubricated with saliva) have a higher mean torque than dry torques (unlubricated).

== See also ==
- Torque limiter
