= Preload control =

Amount of the no-load tension in the bolted joint (preload) greatly affects the reliability of the joint. Multiple techniques exist for preload control to ensure that the tension in the bolt is close to the one specified in the design (some bolt-to-bolt statistical variations are inevitable):

- torque-controlled tightening is a simple and most popular approach: the fastener is tightened until the torque limit is reached. While for many applications checking just the torque (so called torque control, typically enforced via the use of using a torque wrench or a torque screwdriver, is sufficient, it effectively involves "statistical gambling", where a proper installation of a particular fastener cannot be ascertained. A major part of the torque is due to friction, so the differences in friction can cause large variations of the preload with the same torque setting;
- angle-controlled tightening (also known as turn-of-the-nut method) is a technique where the bolt joint is rotated to some angle that ensures the stress beyond the yield limit of the parts. While the method produces a repeatable preload, the thread might fail after multiple re-tightenings and finding the proper angle requires experimentation;
- torque-angle tightening (also known as torque-angle tension control) is a method of securing the bolted joint when the initial tension is critical for reliability and safety. The technique relies on simultaneous monitoring of both the torque applied during the tightening as well as the angle of rotation, usually using a torque/angle wrench. The basic process of torque-angle control is simple: apply torque to the fastener until a preset limit is reached, then finish the installation by rotating the part by an additional angle. The modern torque/angle wrenches collect a "signature" of the tightening process (history of torque moments and corresponding rotation angles); the resulting moment vs. angle curve (also known as M-alpha curve) should be checked against the assembly process limits established at the engineering phase.
- yield-controlled tightening;
- bolt-stretch method utilizes a hydraulic ram that stretches the bolt by pulling on the threaded section of the bolt that protrudes through the nut. Nut is rotated into position with very small torque applied. Once the external stretching force is removed, the preload is established;
- heat tightening is based on stretching the bolt by heating it. Once the bolt is expanded, the nut is secured using the turn-of-the-nut method. Upon cooling, a desired preload is achieved as the bolt contracts. This slow and exotic method is used when the bolts are very large;
- tension-indicating methods there are a number of ways to physically monitor the tension or elongation of a bolt or stud as it is being tightened, these include: Physically measuring the amount of elongation or "stretch" as the bolt is tightened using a dial gauge or other precision measuring device. Incorporating a strain gauge to measure the elongation and tensile stress. Other simplified methods include specially designed bolts and nuts that have built-in features indicating the tension (for example, bumps that are flattened when the preload reaches the calculated value).

== Sources ==
- Shoberg, Ralph S. (1998). "Torque-angle tension control". Handbook of Bolts and Bolted Joints. Taylor & Francis. ISBN 978-0-8247-9977-9.
- Bickford, John H. (2007-08-24). Introduction to the Design and Behavior of Bolted Joints, Fourth Edition. Boca Raton, Fla.: CRC Press. ISBN 978-0-8493-8176-8.
- Campbell, F.C. (2012). Fatigue and Fracture: Understanding the Basics. Ingenieria e ingenieria civil. ASM International. ISBN 978-1-61503-976-0.
- Kulak, Geoffrey L.; Struik, John H. A.; Fisher, John W. (2001). Guide to Design Criteria for Bolted and Riveted Joints (PDF). AISC. ISBN 1-56424-075-4.
