= Saltus-Werk Max Forst GmbH =

Coordinates: 51°09′49″N 7°07′02″E

SALTUS Industrial Technique GmbH
- Type: GmbH
- Industry: Manufacturer / Product Company
- Founded: 1919
- Headquarters: Solingen, Germany
- Products: Torque wrenches, Sockets and Special Sockets
- Number of employees: 90
- Website: http://www.saltus.de

SALTUS Industrial Technique GmbH, or SALTUS, located in Solingen/Germany is a part of the Swedish Atlas Copco Group with main office in Stockholm/Sweden. Saltus is integrated in the Group since 2013 as product company with focus of engineering and production of torque wrenches as well as sockets, bits and special, customized sockets.

== Today ==
Around 90 employees are working at Saltus mainly in engineering and production.

== History ==
- 1919, Max Forst founded a metalworking business in Solingen which manufactured hot-formed metal parts and tools.
- 1931, the company was renamed Max Forst Werkzeugfabrik (tool manufacturers).
- 1938, the company patented the world's first click-type torque wrench.
- 1939, the first torque screwdriver was patented.
- 1949, the company patented a ring-ratchet system with interchangeable tool inserts.
- 1953, a design patent was registered for the multifunctional "3=1" combined open-jaw and joint-socket spanner.

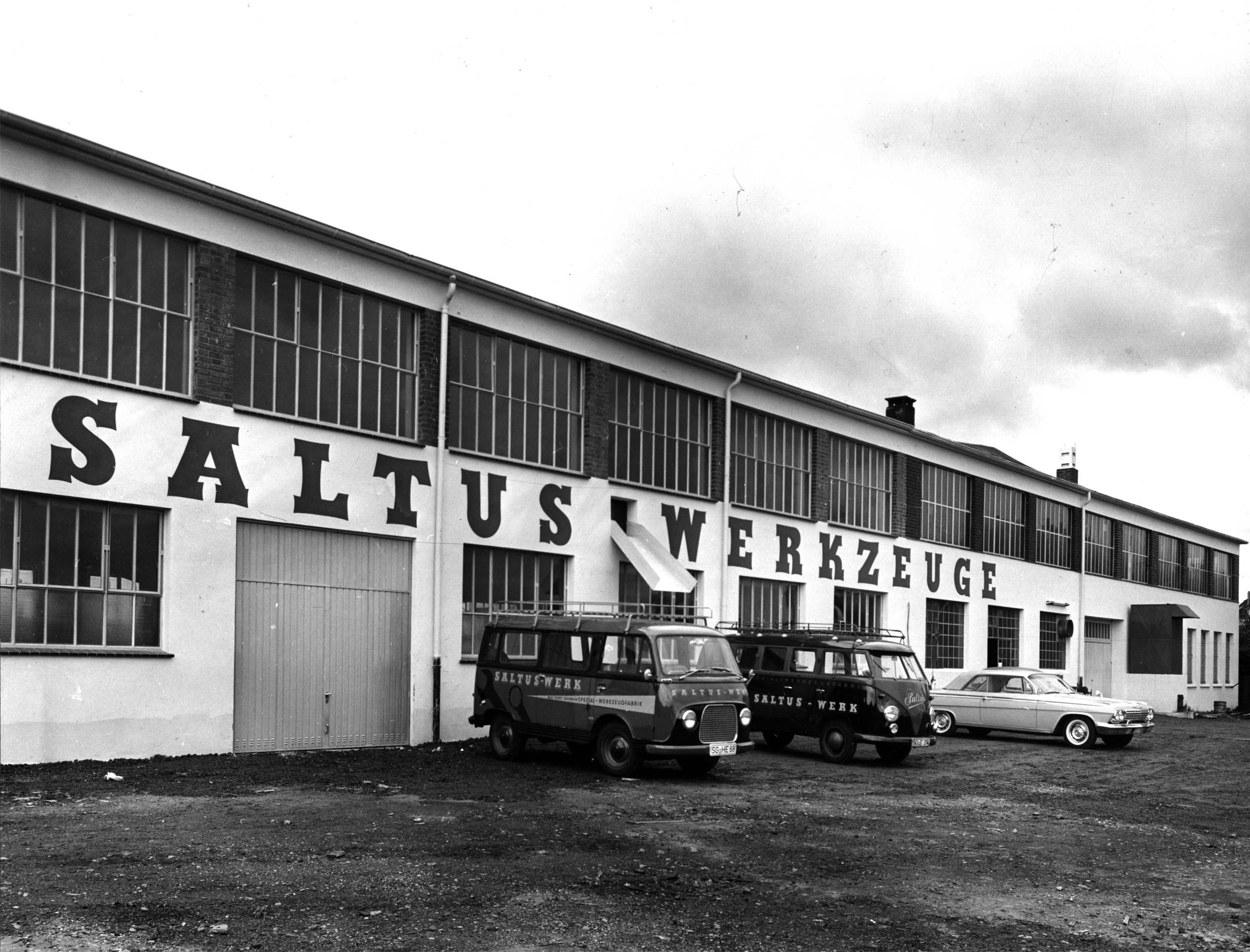
Saltus in former times

Saltus double-ended swivel-head socket wrench from the second half of the 20th century.

- 1957, Max Forst Werkzeugfabrik was renamed Saltus-Werk Max Forst KG.
- 1987, The entirely electronic torque wrench, the DAZ-E, was developed which was able to display, save, analyse and document measurements for the first time.
- 1992, the EKDS, an electronic torque wrench particularly suited to fast production tasks, is patented internationally.
- 1995, Saltus filed an international patent application for the first electronic torque wrench with angle measurement not requiring a reference arm.
- 1997, Saltus-Werk Max Forst GmbH becomes a wholly owned subsidiary of Saltus Technology AG.
- 2004, the first mechatronic torque wrench (mechanical cut-out with wireless data transmission) is patented.}
- 2013, Saltus has been acquired by the Swedish Atlas Copco Group and has been integrated in the Group as product company focussing on torque wrenches and accessories.

The production facility, as of 2018, is in Tierp, Sweden.
