= MJT =

MJT may refer to:

- Metro Jabar Trans, a public transport in Bandung, Indonesia
- Mytilene International Airport on Lesbos Island, Greece
- Multi-jackbolt tensioner, for fastening parts together
- Sauria Paharia language, spoken in the Bengal area
- MJT + 3, a jazz ensemble led by Walter Perkins (musician)
