= Cap torque tester =

The cap torque tester is used in the packaging industry to measure the opening or closing torque of the screw cap. Proper torque is required for the cap to perform its functions of maintaining a tight seal. It is a piece of specific quality control equipment that can be placed on the production line or in the laboratory. Several designs have been developed.

== Packaging development ==
A torque tester is required during the packaging design process. It can be used as a destructive tester to identify if there is any material weakness of the packaging during the screwing process. It also allows one to define the torque tolerances of the capping machine. The lower torque limit is considered the minimum pressure of the cap to avoid any leak of the product. This torque test needs to be combined with a leak test with secure seal analyzer. The higher torque limit is the maximum torque the customer can apply to open or close the product's cap.

The best application torque and the removal torque can be determined experimentally with the specific capping equipment, bottle, contents, closure, and closure liner.

== Production line control ==
Once torque tolerances have been defined, the cap torque tester is used as a torque control device on the final product. If measurements are out of the limits, the capping machine needs to be adjusted. Depending on the production process, it could be necessary to control the opening torque, 24 hours after the packaging process. Temperature variations can modify product characteristics with a result of different torque measurement.
