= Orders of magnitude (torque) =

Comparison of a wide range of torques

The following are examples of orders of magnitude for torque.

== Examples ==
List of orders of magnitude for torque
Order of magnitude	Value		Item
Order of magnitude	SI units	Imperial units	Item
10^{−36}	3.9 × 10^{−36} N⋅m		Computed radiative torque on a model interstellar dust grain — an irregular silicate grain 0.2 μm across — spun by the anisotropy of ambient starlight in the local interstellar radiation field. This torque drives grains to rotation rates hundreds of times faster than thermal, and underlies the polarization of starlight and the alignment of grains with the Galactic magnetic field.
10^{−24}	9.27 × 10^{−24} N⋅m		Torque on a magnetic dipole of one Bohr magneton oriented perpendicular to a 1 tesla magnetic field. This is a characteristic scale rather than a measured value: the expression τ = μ × B is semi-classical; quantum-mechanically, the torque causes Larmor precession rather than a mechanical twist.
10^{−22}	2 × 10^{−22} N⋅m	1.5 × 10^{−22} lb⋅ft	Mean torque applied to an oxygen molecule by an 'optical centrifuge', spinning it from the rotational ground state to a measured rotational quantum number of N = 95 over a pulse of order 50 ps; from the photon angular momentum ℏ transferred per unit of N. Two counter-chirped laser beams combine into a linearly polarized pulse whose polarization direction rotates with increasing angular frequency; the molecule's induced dipole follows it adiabatically, reaching rotation frequencies above 10 THz.
10^{−20}	4 × 10^{−20} N⋅m		Torque generated by a single molecule of F_{1}-ATPase, the rotary catalytic subcomplex of ATP synthase, while hydrolysing ATP.
10^{−18}	9 × 10^{−18} N⋅m	6.6 × 10^{−18} lb⋅ft	Torque on a magnetotactic holobiont — a flagellated protist carrying dozens of magnetic bacterial ectosymbionts — aligned perpendicular to the Earth's magnetic field, taken as 50 μT, from a mean magnetic moment of 1.8 ± 0.8 × 10^{−13} A⋅m^{2} measured by U-turn analysis of 22 swimming cells.
10^{−15}	1.6 × 10^{−15} N⋅m	1.2 × 10^{−15} lb⋅ft	Magneto-mechanical torque generated by a single synthetic antiferromagnetic nanoplatelet 1.88 μm in diameter and 72 nm thick, measured from the deflection of an atomic force microscope cantilever in a 373 mT field applied 12° from the platelet's magnetic anisotropy axis.
10^{−13}	2 × 10^{−13} N⋅m	1.5 × 10^{−13} lb⋅ft	Torque generated by the flagella of a Volvox carteri colony to spin it about its anterior–posterior axis while swimming, from a measured rotational frequency and the Stokes rotational drag coefficient 8πηR^{3} for a sphere of radius R ≈ 200 μm in water. A free-swimming body at low Reynolds number is torque-free, so this is equally the viscous torque the water exerts in resisting the rotation.
10^{−12}	3 × 10^{−12} N⋅m	2.2 × 10^{−12} lb⋅ft	Peak aerodynamic pitching torque about the centre of mass of the featherwing beetle Paratuposa placentis, one of the smallest known insects, at 2.43 μg body mass and 395 μm body length. Its bristled wings — setae rather than membrane over 95% of the wing area — beat at 177 Hz in a figure-of-eight cycle at a Reynolds number near 9, where air behaves as a viscous fluid and the gaps between the bristles effectively close.
10^{−9}	2 × 10^{−9} N⋅m	1.5 × 10^{−9} lb⋅ft	Peak aerodynamic yaw torque generated by a fruit fly (Drosophila melanogaster) during a rapid turning manoeuvre, produced by subtle asymmetries in wing motion.
10^{−7}	3 × 10^{−7} N⋅m	2 × 10^{−7} lb⋅ft	Gravitational torque on the torsion balance in the 1798 Cavendish experiment, the first measurement of the density of the Earth: 158 kg lead spheres attracting two 0.73 kg balls mounted on a 1.83 m rod.
10^{−5}	2 × 10^{−5} N⋅m	1.5 × 10^{−5} lb⋅ft	Torque generated by the hygroscopic awn of a Pelargonium seed as it coils, drilling the seed into the soil; the awn coils when dry and uncoils when wet, converting the day–night humidity cycle into rotation.
10^{−3}	3.3 × 10^{−3} N⋅m	2.4 × 10^{−3} lb⋅ft	Maximum torque delivered by the mainspring barrel of a mechanical wristwatch movement.
10^{−2}	1.1 × 10^{−2} N⋅m	8 × 10^{−3} lb⋅ft	Net torque spinning up the asteroid Bennu, from a measured rotational acceleration of 2.64 × 10^{−6} deg/day^{2}; consistent with the YORP effect, the recoil of thermally re-radiated sunlight from an irregularly shaped body.
10^{0}	1 N⋅m	0.73 lb⋅ft	Torque when one end of a 1 m long moment arm is acted upon by a force of 1 N.
10^{0}	4.1 N⋅m to 6.6 N⋅m	3.0 lb⋅ft to 4.9 lb⋅ft	Torque required to open a vacuum-sealed glass jar with a 65 mm or 85 mm lid. Ergonomic studies have proposed limiting this to 2 N⋅m, which most adults over 50 can exert.
10^{2}	108 N⋅m to 149 N⋅m	80 lb⋅ft to 110 lb⋅ft	Torque to which most lug nuts are tightened.
10^{2}	881 N⋅m	650 lb⋅ft	Torque at the crankshaft of a Dodge Charger SRT HellCat.
10^{4}	13,000 N⋅m		Example 2 MW wind turbine, generator side.
10^{6}	1,300,000 N⋅m		Example 2 MW wind turbine, blade side.
10^{6}	7,000,000 N⋅m	5162935 lb⋅ft	Output torque of the Wärtsilä RT-flex96C, the largest piston engine in the world.
10^{7}	1.45 × 10^{7} N⋅m	1.07 × 10^{7} lb⋅ft	Maximum torque experienced by the 65-meter-tall Fukushima Mirai wind turbine about its base across typical wind speeds, with this peak being at a wind speed of 12 m/s.
10^{9}	2.45 × 10^{9} N⋅m	1.8 × 10^{9} lb⋅ft	Maximum rated load moment of the Sarens SGC-250 ring crane ("Big Carl"), 250,000 tonne-force-metres, one of the largest land-based cranes ever built.
10^{11}	3 × 10^{11} N⋅m	2 × 10^{11} lb⋅ft	Maximum restoring moment of the Ninian Central Platform, a 623,000-tonne concrete gravity-based structure standing in 133 m of water in the North Sea, taken as its buoyancy-reduced weight acting at the 70 m radius of its base slab. Being a gravity based structure which uses no piles, it resists overturning only through its own weight.
10^{13}	1 × 10^{13} N⋅m	8 × 10^{12} lb⋅ft	Hydrostatic overturning moment about the base of Grand Coulee Dam at full reservoir, for a crest length of 1,592 m and water standing about 160 m deep against the upstream face. Pressure rises linearly with depth, so the resultant thrust acts one third of the way up from the base; the Columbia's canyon is too wide here for an arch dam, so the structure resists this moment by its own weight alone.
10^{14}	3.5 × 10^{14} N⋅m	2.6 × 10^{14} lb⋅ft	Seismic moment of the 2012 Huizinge earthquake, the largest induced earthquake recorded in the Groningen gas field, from a circular rupture of radius 390 m slipping an average of 5 cm; an internal torque, since an earthquake source acts as a double couple whose two opposing couples cancel, conserving angular momentum.
10^{16}	4.5 × 10^{16} N⋅m	3.3 × 10^{16} lb⋅ft	Secular tidal torque of the Moon on the Earth, which slows Earth's rotation and drives lunar recession.
10^{19}	1.0 × 10^{19} N⋅m	7.7 × 10^{18} lb⋅ft	Anomaly in the global mountain torque between the atmosphere and the solid Earth during the 1997–1998 El Niño: 10.4 Hadley, where 1 Hadley = 10^{18} N⋅m. Atmospheric pressure bearing unevenly on the world's mountain ranges transfers angular momentum to the atmosphere, lengthening the day by up to 0.9 ms.
10^{23}	3.3 × 10^{23} N⋅m	2.4 × 10^{23} lb⋅ft	Braking torque exerted on the Sun by the solar wind, measured in situ by the Wind spacecraft; independent estimates span roughly 2–3.3 × 10^{23} N⋅m. The Sun's magnetic field grips the escaping wind out to the Alfvén surface, carrying angular momentum away and slowing the Sun's rotation.
10^{29}	2.4 × 10^{29} N⋅m	1.8 × 10^{29} lb⋅ft	Electromagnetic spin-down torque on the Crab Pulsar, from its measured rotation frequency and spin-down rate. Assumes the canonical (conventional approximation) of 10^{38} kg⋅m^{2} for the neutron star moment of inertia.
10^{32}	8 × 10^{32} N⋅m	6 × 10^{32} lb⋅ft	Minimum mean torque on the crust of the Vela Pulsar during its 2016 glitch. A lower bound, since the rise time is an upper limit; an internal torque, so the star's total angular momentum is conserved; assumes the canonical neutron star moment of inertia of 10^{38} kg⋅m^{2}.
10^{48}	1.2 × 10^{48} N⋅m	8.5 × 10^{47} lb⋅ft	Frictional torque exerted by the dark matter halo on the stellar bar of a simulated Milky Way–like galaxy, from a reported mean of 58.0 in units of 10^{10} M_{☉} (km/s)^{2} averaged over 1–4 Gyr of evolution. Halo orbits resonant with the bar are trapped into a density wake that lags the bar in azimuth, and the gravitational pull of that trailing overdensity drains the bar's angular momentum.
