= Superbolt =

Superbolt may refer to:

- An unusually powerful lightning bolt
- A multi-jackbolt tensioner
- An unofficial nickname for the Republic XP-47J and Republic XP-72 fighter aircraft
