= IBES =

IBES may refer to:

- Institute for a Broadband-Enabled Society, a research institute in Melbourne, Australia
- Institutional Brokers' Estimate System, a service founded by the New York brokerage firm Lynch, Jones & Ryan

== See also ==
- Ibes, a plural of ibis
