= Institute for a Broadband-Enabled Society =

Australian research institute

Coordinates: 37°47′56″S 144°57′40″E

The Institute for a Broadband-Enabled Society (IBES) is an Australian research institute focusing on the development of broadband-enabled applications and technologies. The institute is based in the Department of Electrical and Electronic Engineering at The University of Melbourne in Victoria (Australia). Research in the centre is clustered around five research themes:

- Education and Learning
- Health and Wellbeing
- Network Deployment and Economics
- Service and Business Transformation
- Social Infrastructure and Communities

== History ==
The institute was established in 2009 with funding from the University of Melbourne and the State Government of Victoria. The Institutes aim is to develop research that will be able to exploit the Australian Government's National Broadband Network. IBES is one of a number of research institutes developed by the University of Melbourne to increase interdisciplinary research activity. The institute's Director is Laureate Professor Rod Tucker.

== Organisation ==
The institute was established in 2009. IBES is jointly funded by the University of Melbourne and the Victorian State Government, through the Department of Business and Innovation.

=== Advisory board ===
The Advisory Board provides advice on matters relating to research directions, business strategies, and industry linkages. The members of the Advisory Board include:

- Steve Wood, CEO Tennis Australia
- Genevieve Bell, Intel Fellow
- Chris Hancock, CEO AARNet
- Shaun Page, VP, A/NZ Juniper Networks

== Centres ==
Two centres are associated with the Institute for a Broadband-Enabled Society these are:

- Centre for Energy-Efficient Telecommunications CEET, a joint partnership between Alcatel-Lucent's Bell Labs, The University of Melbourne and the Victorian State Government
- Centre for Health Informatics

=== Industry Partner Program ===
The Industry Partner Program at IBES is modeled on similar programs that operate at universities in the United States. IBES has 20 partners that have included cash and in-kind support for IBES research. These companies are:

- Alcatel-Lucent
- Cisco
- Huawei
- Ericsson
- NEC
- Optus
- NICTA
- AARNet
- Opticomm
- Anue
- Allied Telesis
- Clarity
- Haliplex
- Microsoft
- Netgear
- Pacific Broadband Networks
- Telecom Test Solutions
- Warren and Brown

== Research ==
There are currently 144 researchers engaged in 40 research projects supported by IBES. Projects are supported through seed funding.

=== Test Bed ===
The Test Bed is a core part of IBES' research. The Test Bed consists of end user, access, aggregation and transport components. These interconnect with typical retail service provider equipment. The equipment can be configured in a variety ways to allow almost any network topology and architecture to be simulated.

The end user component consists of passive optical network (PON) optical network termination devices - the customer end points of the fibre to the premises network. The Test Bed also houses examples of end user devices found in the home or office, such as 3D televisions, iPads, computers, notebooks and smart phones. Wireless routers, IPTV set top boxes and media servers have been donated by Netgear. Cisco has donated Telepresence video conferencing equipment. There are a number of different passive optical network systems in the test-bed which have been donated by Huawei, Allied Telesis and NEC. The aggregation and transport network consists of Huawei equipment. The service edge component provides connectivity to the Internet and co-located applications such as video on demand media servers, as well as connectivity to off-site hardware and applications.
