= Torque screwdriver =

Screwdriver with a torque-limiting clutch mechanism

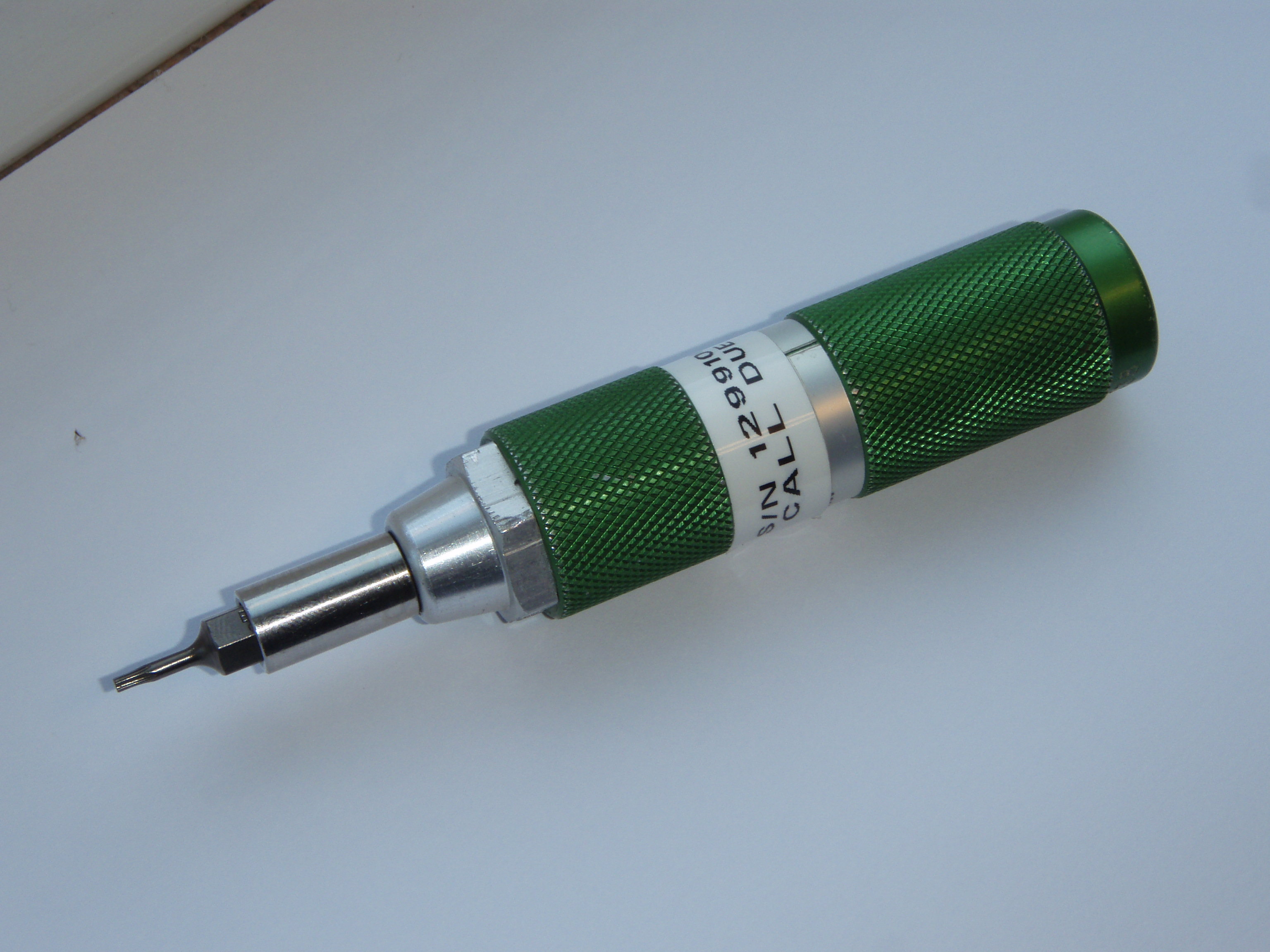
Manual torque screwdriver with torx bit

A torque screwdriver is a screwdriver with components that ensure tightening to a specified torque, ensuring tightening which is sufficient, but not excessive. An insufficiently tightened screw connection may loosen in operation, and excessive tightening can damage parts; for example, if the nuts holding the wheel of a car in place are too loose, or damaged by overtightening, a wheel may come off at speed. Torque screwdrivers are used in mechanical production, manufacturing, and maintenance; their use is part of quality assurance.

Most torque screwdrivers allow the torque to be set to any value within a range. All have a torque-limiting clutch that disengages once the preset torque has been reached.

Torque screwdrivers can exert torques from 0.04 N⋅m to at least 27 N⋅m. Although no single tool covers the entire range, low-, mid-, and high-torque ranges are available.

Torque screwdrivers and torque wrenches have similar purposes and mechanisms.

== Torque-limiting clutch ==
The clutch is the component that defines a torque screwdriver. This is achieved with steel balls rolling between indented plates, compressed by a spring at one end, and the other side driving a screw or fastener. The torque limiting clutch is the part of the tool that limits the amount of torque being applied to the fastener at the receiving end of the tool. On simpler tools the clutch settings may be marked with arbitrary numbers (e.g., from 1 for the lowest available torque to 20 for the highest, without necessarily having a linear relationship with actual torque) rather than torque values.

Torque screwdrivers are available with several types of clutch, including “cam-over”, “cushion clutch”, and “auto shutoff”. Most of these clutch types are used in electric screwdrivers, air screwdrivers, impulse screwdrivers, manual torque screwdrivers, and cordless torque screwdrivers. Each type has the ability to preset a specified torque value. In some cases a tool may need to be certified in a calibration lab to verify its torque output; a certificate may be issued by an organisation such as NIST in the United States.

=== Cam over ===
A Cam-over clutch is usually found in a manual torque screwdriver where the clutch simply “fags“ or “cams-over”, meaning that it signals the maximum torque has been achieved.

=== Cushion clutch ===
Cushion clutch or “slip clutch” styles are found in both electric screwdrivers and air screwdrivers. This clutch style is similar to the “cam-over” once the final torque is reached because the clutch continues to cam over and slip. It will continue to run until the operator releases the throttle.

=== Auto shutoff ===
An auto-shutoff clutch switches off the tool once the maximum torque is reached. Auto shutoff tools are designed for critical applications. They provide precision torque control and reduce energy consumption by eliminating idling.

== Drive source ==
The torque may be provided manually (by the operator's wrist), by an electric motor, or by a pneumatic drive.

=== Manual torque screwdriver ===
Manual torque screwdrivers are made in straight and pistol-grip models. Manual torque screwdrivers can have a range of 0.04 N⋅m (6 in oz) to 20 N⋅m (170 in lb).

=== Electric torque screwdriver ===
Screwdriving requires torque to be applied by a rotary motion. Drilling responds to the same description; general-purpose power tools ("drill/drivers") are designed for both screwdriving and drilling, with a slipping clutch and low speed added to the drilling functionality. In an industrial environment dedicated tools optimised for their particular function are more often used.

==== Corded ====
Corded electric torque screwdrivers are commonly made in three different designs: pistol grip, angle and inline. This type is the one mostly used for industrial assembly applications such as electronic assembly and small parts assembly. Brushed electric motors and more efficient brushless motors are used. The torque ranges typically from 0.02 N⋅m to at least 27 N⋅m, with speeds of up to 2,000 revolutions per minute (rpm).

Electric screwdrivers with transducers can be categorized into three groups according to their physical features:

Pistol grip
Enables the user to hold the tool and apply up to 10 N⋅m of torque; more than that is not recommended due to ergonomics. Lets the user hold the tool with one hand and offers better accessibility in some cases.
Angle type
With angle-type tightener user can tighten with up to 100 N⋅m torque using both hands, or even more with the help of assistive tools. In some cases it can offer better for accessibility to the tightening point.
Inline type
Looks like a regular screwdriver. Not possible to tighten manually more with more than 2 N⋅m of torque. Commonly used on machines and manipulators. Can apply go up to 1000 N⋅m torque on machines. Mostly used in the trucking and flight industries, especially for wheel tightening.

==== Cordless ====
Cordless torque screwdriver are powered by batteries, usually rechargeable batteries with voltages from 3.6 to 18 volts. Dedicated screwdrivers for domestic use tend to operate off 3.6 to 4.8 volts and have relatively low maximum torque; drill/drivers operate off higher voltages and can deliver higher maximum torque. Cordless torque screwdrivers are used for the same applications as cordless screwdrivers without torque control.

=== Pneumatic torque screwdriver ===
The pneumatic torque screwdriver is widely used for assembly requiring higher levels of torque. These tools are commonly used in automotive, aerospace and marine manufacturing. Pneumatic tools require a constant pressurized air source. Torque for this type of torque screwdriver ranges from 0.17 N⋅m (1.5 in lb) to 30 N⋅m (265 in lb), and speeds range from 800 to 2600 rpm. These tools must be near their compressed air source, not a problem in manufacturing but less suitable for general maintenance. Torque may not be controlled as accurately as by electrically powered tools.

== See also ==
- Torque wrench
- Torque tester
