= Multi-jackbolt tensioner =

Mechanical fastener

Multi-jackbolt tensioners (MJT) are an alternative to traditional bolted joints. Rather than needing to tighten one large bolt, MJTs use several smaller jackbolts to significantly reduce the torque required to attain a certain preload. MJTs range in thread sizes from 3/4 in (19 mm) to 32 in (810 mm) and can achieve 20 million pounds-force (89×10^{6} N) or more. MJTs only require hand-held tools, such as torque wrenches or air/electric impacts, for loading and unloading bolted joints.

== Basics of multi-jackbolt tensioners ==
Multi-jackbolt tensioners (MJTs), registered under the trademark Superbolt or Supernut, are designed to decrease the torque required to tighten large bolted joints. One of the major problems associated with traditional bolt-tightening methods is that, as the diameter of the bolt increases, the amount of torque required to tighten it increases in the third power of the diameter. Because of this, the largest-size bolt that a person can typically tighten by hand is 1 in (25 mm). Multi-jackbolt tensioners reduce the amount of torque required to clamp the joint by using multiple jackbolts threaded through the nut or bolt head. The jackbolts, which are small enough to be tightened by simple hand tools, thrust against a hardened washer and generate clamping force on the joint. Loads up to 20 million pounds-force (89×10^{6} N) and greater are attainable using only hand tools. MJTs and related products are produced by Superbolt, Inc. in Clinton, PA.

=== Types of tensioners ===
- Nut type
  - Nut-type MJTs, otherwise known as Torquenuts, can be retrofitted onto existing bolts or studs. Because of this, they are the most common type of MJT.
- Bolt type
  - Bolt-type MJTs, otherwise known as Torquebolts, have a ring of jackbolts almost touching the bolt shank. They typically have smaller outside diameters than Torquenuts. With Torquebolts, it is possible to have very close spacing even at high preloads.
- Thrust-collar type
  - Thrust-collar-type MJTs are used in applications where it is difficult to use threaded tensioners, such as on rolling mills where the joint would typically need to be tightened by crane wrenching. Jackbolts push a threadless nut against a retainer ring, which is fitted into a groove and transfers the jacking force to the main bolt or stud. Because there are no threads, they can also be used in press-column applications, eliminating the problems and hassles associated with large nut threads.

=== Construction and operation ===
The main bolt or nut is assembled by hand, and there is no torque load on its thread as it is turned up about a quarter- to eighth-turn short of contact. Therefore it has no flats or splines, but is cylindrical and may have a knurled outer surface. There are six, eight, or more hex headed jackbolts evenly spaced around the head, which are long enough to extend beyond the base surface to stretch the main bolt to the required pretension, and small enough diameter for manual tightening. When the fastener is assembled, a hardened washer is fitted under the head for the jackbolts to bear against without damaging the fitment surface. After loose assembly by hand, four of the jackbolts are torqued up to 50% pre-tension in a top-bottom-right-left sequence using a standard manual torque wrench, then retorqued in the same order to full nominal preload. After this, they are all sequentially retightened to full torque until less than 20° turn is needed to click the torque wrench, at which point the installation is complete. Removal is also in stages, loosening each jackbolt by one-eighth turn on the first round, then one-quarter turn per round repeatedly until loose and the main fastener can be turned by hand.

== Mechanical advantage ==
MJTs have a high mechanical advantage for tightening large nuts. To calculate mechanical advantage over standard hex nuts, the formula

$$MA = \frac {T}{T_j}= \frac {nDA}{d}$$

is used, where

MA	= overall mechanical advantage
T	= main thread torque
T_{j}	= jackbolt torque
n	= number of jackbolts
D	= main thread pitch diameter
d	= jackbolt pitch diameter
A	= torque advantage of jackbolts over tension bolts (with graphite lube A = 1.37)

== Safety ==
MJTs are a relatively safe bolting method because only small hand or air tools are required for tightening. Other methods, including thermal tightening, crane wrenching, hydraulic wrenches, and sledgehammers, can cause serious worker injuries due to heat, electricity, highly pressurized hydraulic fluid, and brute force. Back and other injuries can also be avoided because no heavy tightening equipment needs to be lifted onto the bolt. Safety is also increased because MJTs prevent parts from becoming loose.

== Downtime ==
Due to dynamic loads, bolted joints have a tendency to loosen. Downtime is significantly reduced because MJTs are able to easily achieve the large clamping forces required to prevent bolted components from vibrating loose. Therefore, less time is spent tightening joints repeatedly and fixing problems caused by loose joints. MJTs also reduce the likelihood that the bolted joint will fail, which reduces downtime caused by needing to replace damaged components.

== Installation time ==
Even though more individual jackbolts must be tightened, installation is still fast in comparison to other methods. Because the torque required to tighten each small jackbolt is exponentially less than the torque required to tighten one large nut, it takes less time and effort overall to tighten the larger number of jackbolts. Also, no additional time is spent moving around heavy equipment to tighten each nut. Installation processes have been developed using air tools, which also greatly reduces installation time. Additionally, multiple workers can work on a joint simultaneously since the tooling required is inexpensive. Another common method, thermal tightening, can take a long time because the stud must be heated, and clamping force is not obtained and cannot be checked until it is cooled since it depends on shrinkage. If the stud is not at proper stretch, the heating process must be repeated.

== Versatility ==
MJTs are very versatile tools. They can be used in tight spaces because no bulky equipment is required to tighten the bolts. MJTs can also be engineered to specifications for almost any application. There are few size limitations, and they can be used with extremely large thread sizes (as high as 32 in (810 mm) thread diameter). They can also be used effectively in high-temperature applications, if proper materials are used. Overall, the unique properties of MJTs created by the use of jackbolts can simplify complicated applications, especially for large thread sizes.

== Joint integrity ==
Thread galling and seizing is significantly reduced because mating bolts or studs are loaded in pure tension without twisting.

In many applications, elasticity in a bolt significantly helps to keep a joint held together. Tests have shown that turbine-type MJTs increase the elasticity of the average bolting system by the equivalent of four stud diameters, and nut-type MJTs increase the elasticity by 4 to 12 diameter equivalents, which would triple or quadruple the elasticity of the bolting system. In other words, MJTs increase elasticity by adding up to 2 to 4 equivalent bolt effective lengths. This is particularly advantageous in high-temperature bolting applications where bolts are subject to creep, because elastic bolting systems will take longer to reach a given relaxation stress than in a rigid system. Elastic bolting systems can also improve the integrity of gasketed joints by compensating for temperature changes, joint movement, and changes in internal pressure.

Most bolts fail at the bottom of the nut in the first two or three threads. Hoop stresses on the nut in MJTs cause an increase in diameter at the bottom and decrease at the top, distributing thread stress more evenly and reducing the likelihood that the stud or bolt will fail.

== Disadvantages ==
MJTs may not be cost-effective for bolts smaller than 1 in (25 mm) diameter, in low-stress applications, and in plants where the number of studs/bolts to retrofit is difficult to justify versus prior investment in existing tightening equipment.

== Common applications ==
=== Presses ===
Multi-jackbolt tensioners can be used on many press-column applications, especially where large thread sizes are required. Thrust collars ease assembly and disassembly on large press columns, while greatly reducing critical problems such as thread galling and seizing. Multi-jackbolt tensioners are also used on tie-rods, bearing blocks, high-pressure piping, die cushions, cylinder ram bolting, and anchor bolts.

=== Mining ===
Mining applications often require high preloads, and joints encounter high dynamic forces, which can cause joints to loosen. MJTs can keep joints tight on boom points, ring gears, side frames, hoist motors, drag lines, pinion gears, split gears, and excavator bearing caps, because the joint is loaded in pure tension without twisting. Some applications, such as toothed rims, require short bolts – MJTs can be useful in these applications because they greatly improve the elasticity of the joint.

=== Hydro power ===
Multi-jackbolt tensioners are used in several hydro applications, including turbine couplings, blade bolts, turbine wheel-to-shaft bolting, pelton turbine nozzles, servo piston nuts, bearing housings, and ball valves. Multi-jackbolt expansion bolts provide additional benefit for shaft couplings, because they generate both radial and axial forces, creating the interference fit necessary. MJTs can also easily achieve the high preloads required on Kaplan turbine crossheads and servo piston rods.

=== Steam power ===
In steam power plants, MJTs are used on boiler feed-pump head and barrel casings, boiler circulation pump main flanges, stop valves, control valves, turbine couplings, stay rods, manway doors, inlet flanges, and feedwater heaters. MJTs can save a lot of time during scheduled downtime or maintenance because they require less time to install and remove than other bolting methods.

=== Steel mill ===
Multi-jackbolt tensioners have a number of uses in the steel industry. Thrust collars can be used on rolling mills, which makes changing the rolls much easier than other methods, and frees up crane time because only hand tools are required. Other MJTs are used on mill motors, bearings, shaft mounts, anchor bolts, and slitter knives.

=== Petrochemical ===
In the petrochemical industry, multi-jackbolt tensioners have been used on reactor vessels, heat exchanger heads, turbine control valves, turbine joints, pipe flanges, anchor bolts, couplings, compressors, and pumps.

=== Gas compression ===
Special multi-jackbolt piston end nuts and crosshead jamnuts are used to ease the installation of piston rods, especially considering space limitations. Other applications include anchor bolts, flexible disk couplings, dehydration towers, compressor cylinders, compressor doghouse bolting, end plates, and gas compression engines.
