= Warren and Brown =

Australian automotive and engineering company

Warren & Brown, Pty Ltd
- Industry: automotive engineering
- Fate: from 1985 a privately owned Pty Ltd company
- Headquarters: Maidstone, Melbourne, Australia

Warren and Brown, often styled W & B, was an Australian company known for manufacturing hand tools for the automotive and engineering trades. Founded in 1947, it was taken over by Repco, an Australian engine manufacturing and reconditioning company, and under their management continued manufacture and development of products aimed at suburban automotive workshops. In 1985, in a major restructure, Repco sold W & B to a small group of investors, in what was termed a management buyout, and continued to operate, manufacturing a diverse range of products.

== History ==
The company was founded in 1921 by Andrew Canfield Brown and company secretary William Howard Warren (– 24 March 1947), as jobbing engineers, in premises at 119 Ballarat Road, Footscray, Victoria.

In 1930 the business was restructured as "Warren and Brown Pty Ltd, ironfounders, mechanical engineers, and manufacturers of machinery, etc." valued at £5,000, as 5,000 £1 (one pound) shares, owned equally by the two principals.

After carrying out work of this nature for several years, the company's production focus shifted to the manufacture of tools to service the motor trade. An early innovation was tooling for inserting valve seats into cylinder heads; This would remain a "W & B" speciality.

The business was gradually extended with the development of a number of production lines suited to automotive reconditioning equipment.

=== World War II ===
At the outbreak of World War II the factory's resources were used to aid the war effort and apart from manufacturing its normal range of products, the company undertook production of tools and gauges for military purposes, including some associated with .303 ammunition.

The company was approached by the United States Government's Director of Machine Tools and Gauges to manufacture a range of self centering chucks, never before manufactured in Australia, and information regarding overseas manufacturing procedures was not available. Warren and Brown commenced an extensive design and tooling programme and after many initial problems made their first deliveries of chucks to Government in February, 1942.

=== Post-war ===
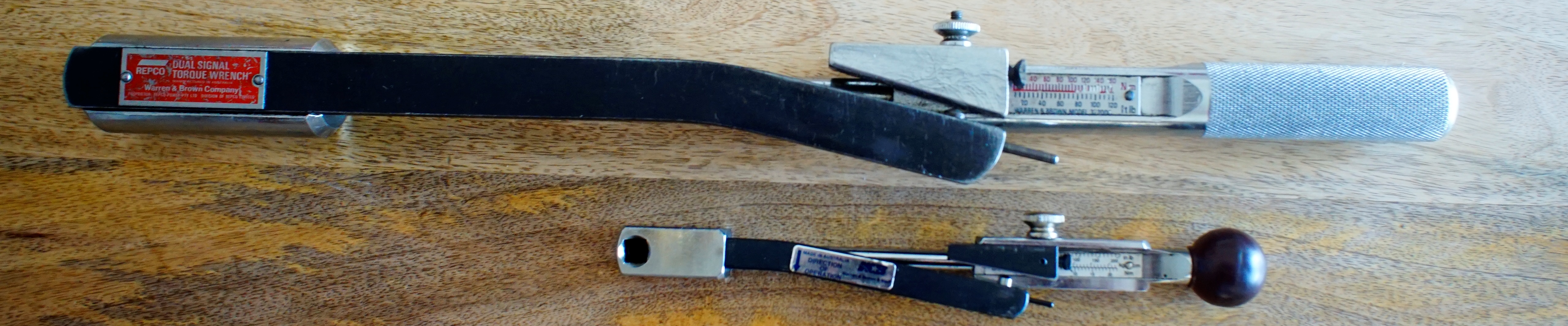
Two W&B torque wrenches

With the war over, the company was prepared to continue manufacturing these chucks, but now instead of supplying them to American industry, they were in competition, and substantial protection was sought for its post-war expansion. In 1946 its capital value was increased to £50,000 by the issuing of a further 45,000 ordinary £1 shares. Sales in 1946 amounted to nearly £13,000, with an estimated annual market of £30,000.

In 1948, Warren and Brown took out patents on the "Dual Signal" trip mechanism for their range of tensioning wrenches. They were released onto the market in 1949 and held a major share of the Australian market well into the 21st-century despite availability of cheaper imports.

Another development around this time was the W & B valve refacing machine, which would be found in most well-equipped engine repair shops. It performed this important job more efficiently than other methods, which usually entailed tying up a (much more expensive) lathe. Other equipment of their design and manufacture commonly found in Australian garages includes their valve seat cutters.

In April 1949 a government inspection reported production staff consisted of 99 males and 9 females; total staff 125 persons.

Warren and Brown, Pty. Ltd was taken over by Repco Ltd in 1949 and became an autonomous subsidiary of that company. Managing director A. C. Brown and directors R. A. Brown and G. W. Cox, were retained on the new board. Their range of manufactures did not change markedly under the new owners, with tension wrenches, valve refacers and precision reamers key products but had the advantage of wider distribution. A year later, Repco increased the nominal value of W & B to £100,000 by the issue of a further 50,000 £1 shares. Five other subsidiaries were similarly revalued.

In 1985 Repco disposed of Warren and Brown in a management buyout. Under this structure the company continued as a manufacturer and supplier of specialized tools to the automotive, industrial, electrical and electronic industries.

=== 21st-century ===
Around 2007, at a time of economic malaise, Warren and Brown Technologies (WBT) undertook a $ 5 million upgrade of their factory, with (unspecified) assistance of the Victorian Government.

The company was inducted into Victorian Manufacturers Hall of Fame 2017

== The principals ==
William Howard Warren (–), generally known as Howard or "W. Howard Warren", was the eldest son of Margaret Hamilton Warren (died 1952) and Daniel Caddins Warren (died 1936), of "Athenae", 55 Napier Street, Footscray, Victoria. He married Queenie Haysom on 18 December 1920. He was an engineer at D. Richardson and Sons' gear works (founded 1890) in 1916 before teaming up with A. C. Brown, also employed at Richardson and Sons'.

Andrew Canfield Brown (– 24 March 1947), engineer, was the eldest son of Robert Canfield Brown (1852 – 19 March 1926) and Catherine Rachel Brown, née McLeod (1856 – 28 December 1931) in 1884; lived at 62 Moreland Street, Footscray, later 30 William Street, Seddon. Brown married Elizabeth Alice "Lizzie" McWilliam on 22 July 1916 lived at "Belle Vue", 119 Ballarat Road, Footscray. An uncle, also named Andrew Canfield Brown (1 July 1859 – 1931) of Blackburn Road, Blackburn, Victoria, was grandfather of Eric Canfield Brown (c. 1924 – 26 September 2008) was made a Member of the Order of Australia in the 1989 Australia Day Honours for services to engineering. The identity of director R. A. Brown, who with A. C. Brown joined the Repco board at the takeover, has not been found. He or she was appointed to the Commonwealth Advisory Committee on Advanced Education (later Australian Commission on Advanced Education) in 1969.

Currently:

Neil Domelow Managing Director and co-owner; may be viewed here (YouTube clip) Domelow grew up in Queensland and became an apprentice with Repco. By 1985 he was MD of the (privately owned) Warren and Brown.

Stephen James "Steve" Normoyle

John Domelow Marketing Director

David Henderson General Manager

Who were the five owners in 1986?

=== Warren & Brown Technologies India Private Limited ===
Incorporated on 13 Nov 2007; registered office is in Gurgaon, Haryana, India. Directors: Devesh Chander Mukhija, Stephen James Normoyle, John William Bridges

== Resources ==
Museums Victoria holds a collection of ephemera associated with Warren and Brown in their Trade Literature collection: TL 8248, TL 10608, TL 17013, TL 37991 – TL 37999, TL 48157 – TL 48166, and TL 59239: publicity brochures, catalogues and instruction sheets published by the company c. 1960 – c. 1963.
