= Torque limiter =

Clutch type

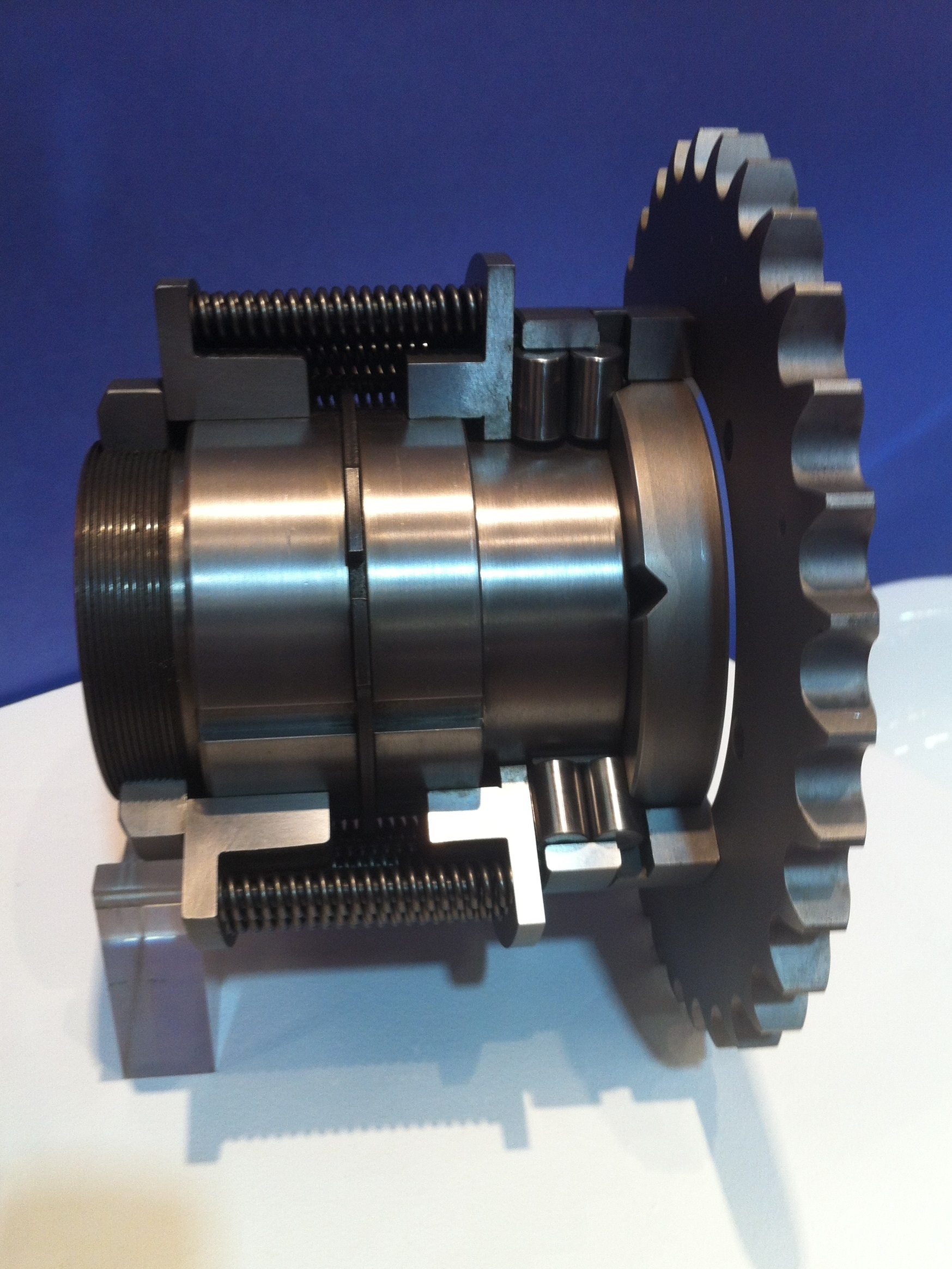
A roller detent type torque limiter that uses springs to push rollers against a notched output plate

A torque limiter is an automatic device that protects mechanical equipment, or its work, from damage by mechanical overload. A torque limiter may limit the torque by slipping (as in a friction plate slip-clutch), or uncouple the load entirely (as in a shear pin). The action of a torque limiter is especially useful to limit any damage due to crash stops and jams.

Torque limiters may be packaged as a shaft coupling or as a hub for sprocket or sheave. A torque limiting device is also known as an overload clutch.

== Disconnect types ==
Disconnect types will uncouple the drive, with little or no residual torque making its way to the load. They may reset automatically or manually

=== Shear pin ===
A shear pin type sacrifices a mechanical component, the pin, to disconnect the shafts. The use of shear pins as torque limiters has been well known since at least the early 20th century.

=== Synchronous magnetic ===
A synchronous magnetic torque limiter uses permanent magnets mounted to each shaft, with an air gap between. They are very fast acting, but may have more backlash than mechanical types. Because there is no mechanical contact between the two shafts, they are also used to transmit torque through a physical barrier like a thin plastic wall. On some models, the torque limit may be adjusted by changing the gap between the magnets.

=== Ball detent ===
A ball detent type limiter transmits force through hardened balls which rest in detents on the shaft and are held in place with springs. An over-torque condition pushes the balls out of their detents, thereby decoupling the shaft. It can have single or multiple detent positions, or a snap acting spring which requires a manual reset. There may be a compression adjustment to adjust the torque limit.

Many cordless drills incorporate this type of torque limiter in a planetary gearset. It may be a part of an assembly of multiple gearsets used to primarily reduce speed and multiply torque as well as perform ratio changes. The torque limiter is typically the last gearset in the transmission. It uses the planet carrier as the input with the sun gear as the output, and the annulus normally locked. A series of ball detents act on the annulus to lock it, allowing power to be transmitted from the planet carrier to the sun gear. When the torque transmitted through the gearset reaches a determinate amount, the torque acting on the annulus causes it to unlock from its ball detents and freely rotate, causing power to be diverted from the load on the sun gear to the annulus and thereby stalling the output until torque is reduced to an amount where the ball detents can lock the annulus again. This system equally limits torque in both directions of rotation and also works with the sun gear as the input. The compression of the ball detents (and therefore the amount of torque at which the limiter is utilized) is typically adjusted by means of a rotating collar accessible to the user which is indexed and held in place with its own separate ball detents.

=== Pawl and spring ===
This mechanical type uses a spring to hold a drive pawl against a notch in the rotor. It may feature automatic or manual reset. A compression adjustment on the spring determines the torque limit.

=== Friction plate ===
This type is similar to a friction plate clutch. Over-torque will cause the plates to slip. A simple example is found in a fixed-spool fishing reel, where the slipping torque is set by means of a large hand nut in order that the reel will turn and allow more line to unwind before the line breaks under the pull of a fish.

=== Magnetic particle ===
A magnetic particle clutch can be used effectively as a torque limiter. The torque setting fairly approximates a linear relationship with the current passing through the windings, which can be statically or dynamically set depending on needs.

=== Magnetic hysteresis ===
This type is non-synchronous in normal operation, so there is always some slippage.

== See also ==
- Torque converter
