= Torque tester =

Tool quality control device

A torque tester is a quality control device to test or calibrate torque-controlled tools. This includes electronic torque wrenches, click torque wrenches, dial torque wrenches, electric screwdrivers, air screwdrivers, pulse tools, cordless screwdrivers, nutrunners, and torque screwdrivers. Advanced torque testers include the ability to measure in clockwise and counter-clockwise directions, and potentially convert to engineering units (such as in·oz, in·lb, ft·lb, N·m, cN·m, kgf·cm, gf·cm, kgf·fm). They can also have different modes of operation (such as peak, 1st peak, track), and may include a certificate from a local regulator (such as NIST).

Torque testers measure properties such as torsional strength and stiffness and are used in quality control of various fields including medical devices, metals, and aerospace. Cap torque testers are also frequently used of measure the removal torque of screw caps on bottles and jars.

== Components ==
=== Transducer ===
A torque transducer, similar to a load cell, is an electronic device used to convert torque into an electrical signal. This conversion is indirect and happens in two stages. Through a mechanical arrangement, the torque being sensed deforms a strain gauge. The strain gauge converts the deformation (strain) to electrical signals. A torque transducer usually consists of four strain gauges in a Wheatstone bridge configuration. Torque transducers of one or two strain gauges are also available. The electrical signal output is typically in the order of a few millivolts and usually requires amplification by an instrumentation amplifier before it can be used. The output of the transducer is plugged into an algorithm to calculate the force applied to the transducer. There are several styles available for torque transducers. Rotary, stationary (reaction), and inline are used for different calibration and audit purposes.

=== Digital display ===
A key component of modern torque testers is the digital display. A digital display is used to measure the output signal from the transducer and calculates that reading into a torque value that is displayed on screen. In most cases the display and transducer are contained together inside a housing. This is known as a "Desktop Torque Tester". External rotary and stationary transducers can be used with portable displays (handheld torque analyzers).

=== Rundown fixture (joint simulator) ===
A rundown fixture, also known as a joint simulator, is used during the calibration process to help test power tools (electric screwdrivers, air screwdrivers, pulse tools, cordless screwdrivers, nutrunners, etc.). A joint simulator is placed on top of the transducers. An adapter bit is inserted into the power tool and is mated to the top of the joint simulator. By using springs of different stiffness or stacking Belleville washers in set patterns, the joint simulator can replicate soft, medium, or hard joints. This is important when trying to repeat how a tool may be used during an actual process.
