= Torque =

Turning force around an axis

- Relationship between force F, torque τ, linear momentum p, and angular momentum L in a system which has rotation constrained to only one plane (forces and moments due to gravity and friction not considered)
- Common symbols: $\tau$, M
- SI unit: N⋅m
- Other units: pound-force-feet, lbf⋅inch, ozf⋅in
- In SI base units: kg⋅m^{2}⋅s^{−2}
- Dimension: $\mathsf{M} \mathsf{L}^2 \mathsf{T}^{-2}$

In physics and mechanics, torque is the rotational correspondent of linear force. It is also referred to as the moment of force, or simply the moment. Just as a linear force is a push or a pull applied to a body, a torque can be thought of as a twist applied to an object with respect to a chosen axis. For example, when driving a screw, a screwdriver applies torque to the screw, causing it to tend to rotate around its axis.

Torque is generally referred to using different vocabulary depending on geographical location and field of study, with torque generally being associated with physics and moment being associated with engineering. This article follows the definition used in US physics in its usage of the word torque.

Torque is typically represented mathematically using the lowercase Greek letter tau (𝜏). When being referred to as moment of force, it is commonly denoted by M.

== Historical terminology ==
The term torque (from Latin torquēre, 'to twist') is said to have been suggested by James Thomson and appeared in print in April, 1884. Usage is attested the same year by Silvanus P. Thompson in the first edition of Dynamo-Electric Machinery. Thompson describes his usage of the term as follows:

Just as the Newtonian definition of force is that which produces or tends to produce motion (along a line), so torque may be defined as that which produces or tends to produce torsion (around an axis). It is better to use a term which treats this action as a single definite entity than to use terms like "couple" and "moment", which suggest more complex ideas. The single notion of a twist applied to turn a shaft is better than the more complex notion of applying a linear force (or a pair of forces) with a certain leverage.

In mechanical engineering in the UK and the US, torque is generally referred to as moment of force, usually shortened to moment. This terminology can be traced back to at least 1811 in Siméon Denis Poisson's Traité de mécanique. An English translation of Poisson's work appeared in 1842.

== Definition and relation to other physical quantities ==
=== Torque as a cross product between linear force and the radius about the rotational axis ===
A particle is located at position r relative to its axis of rotation. When a force F is applied to the particle, only the perpendicular component F_{⊥} produces a torque. This torque τ = r × F has magnitude τ = |r| |F_{⊥}| = |r| |F| sin θ and is directed outward from the page.

The torque about an axis can be calculated by multiplying the linear force applied perpendicularly to a lever multiplied by its distance from the lever's fulcrum (the length of the lever arm).

Therefore, torque is defined as the product of the magnitude of the perpendicular component of the force and the distance of the line of action of a force from the point around which it is being determined.

In three dimensions, the torque is a pseudovector; for point particles, it is given by the cross product of the displacement vector and the force vector. The direction of the torque can be determined by using the right-hand grip rule: if the fingers of the right hand are curled from the direction of the lever arm to the direction of the force, then the thumb points in the direction of the torque. It follows that the torque vector is perpendicular to both the position and force vectors, and defines the plane in which the two vectors lie. The resulting torque vector direction is determined by the right-hand rule. Therefore any force directed parallel to the particle's position vector does not produce a torque. The magnitude of torque applied to a rigid body depends on three quantities: the force applied, the lever arm vector connecting the point about which the torque is being measured to the point of force application, and the angle between the force and lever arm vectors. In symbols:

$$\boldsymbol{\tau} = \mathbf{r} \times \mathbf{F} \implies \tau = rF_{\perp} = rF\sin\theta$$

where

- $\boldsymbol\tau$ is the torque vector and $\tau$ is the magnitude of the torque;
- $\mathbf{r}$ is the position vector (a vector from the point about which the torque is being measured to the point where the force is applied), and r is the magnitude of the position vector;
- $\mathbf{F}$ is the force vector, F is the magnitude of the force vector, and F_{⊥} is the amount of force directed perpendicularly to the position of the particle;
- $\times$ denotes the cross product, which produces a vector that is perpendicular both to r and to F following the right-hand rule;
- $\theta$ is the angle between the force vector and the lever arm vector.

The SI unit for torque is the newton-meter (N⋅m). For more on the units of torque, see § Units.

=== Relationship with the angular momentum ===
The net torque on a body determines the rate of change of the body's angular momentum,

$$\boldsymbol{\tau} = \frac{\mathrm{d}\mathbf{L}}{\mathrm{d}t}$$

where $\mathbf{L}$ is the angular momentum vector and $t$ is time. For the motion of a point particle,

$$\mathbf{L} = I\boldsymbol{\omega},$$

where $I = mr^2$ is the moment of inertia and $\boldsymbol\omega$ is the orbital angular velocity pseudovector. It follows that

$$\boldsymbol{\tau}_{\mathrm{net}} =
I_1\dot{\omega}_1\hat{\boldsymbol{e}}_1 + I_2\dot{\omega}_2\hat{\boldsymbol{e}}_2 + I_3\dot{\omega}_3\hat{\boldsymbol{e}}_3 + I_1\omega_1\frac{\mathrm{d}\hat{\boldsymbol{e}}_1}{\mathrm{d}t} + I_2\omega_2\frac{\mathrm{d}\hat{\boldsymbol{e}}_2}{\mathrm{d}t} + I_3\omega_3\frac{\mathrm{d}\hat{\boldsymbol{e}}_3}{\mathrm{d}t}
= I\boldsymbol\dot{\omega} + \boldsymbol\omega \times (I\boldsymbol\omega)$$

using the derivative of a vector is
$${\mathrm{d}{\hat{\boldsymbol{e}}}_\text{i} \over \mathrm{d}t} = \boldsymbol\omega \times {\hat{\boldsymbol{e}}}_\text{i}$$
This equation is the rotational analogue of Newton's second law for point particles, and is valid for any type of trajectory. In some simple cases like a rotating disc, where only the moment of inertia on rotating axis is, the rotational Newton's second law can be
$$\boldsymbol{\tau} = I\boldsymbol{\alpha}$$
where $\boldsymbol\alpha = \dot\boldsymbol\omega$.

==== Proof of the equivalence of definitions ====
The definition of angular momentum for a single point particle is:
$$\mathbf{L} = \mathbf{r} \times \mathbf{p}$$
where p is the particle's linear momentum and r is the position vector from the origin. The time-derivative of this is:

$$\frac{\mathrm{d}\mathbf{L}}{\mathrm{d}t} = \mathbf{r} \times \frac{\mathrm{d}\mathbf{p}}{\mathrm{d}t} + \frac{\mathrm{d}\mathbf{r}}{\mathrm{d}t} \times \mathbf{p}.$$

This result can easily be proven by splitting the vectors into components and applying the product rule. But because the rate of change of linear momentum is force $\mathbf{F}$ and the rate of change of position is velocity $\mathbf{v}$,

$$\frac{\mathrm{d}\mathbf{L}}{\mathrm{d}t} = \mathbf{r} \times \mathbf{F} + \mathbf{v} \times \mathbf{p}$$

The cross product of momentum $\mathbf{p}$ with its associated velocity $\mathbf{v}$ is zero because velocity and momentum are parallel, so the second term vanishes. Therefore, torque on a particle is equal to the first derivative of its angular momentum with respect to time. If multiple forces are applied, according Newton's second law it follows that
$$\frac{\mathrm{d}\mathbf{L}}{\mathrm{d}t} = \mathbf{r} \times \mathbf{F}_{\mathrm{net}} = \boldsymbol{\tau}_{\mathrm{net}}.$$

This is a general proof for point particles, but it can be generalized to a system of point particles by applying the above proof to each of the point particles and then summing over all the point particles. Similarly, the proof can be generalized to a continuous mass by applying the above proof to each point within the mass, and then integrating over the entire mass.

=== Derivatives of torque ===
In physics, rotatum is the derivative of torque with respect to time

$\mathbf P = \frac{\mathrm d \boldsymbol \tau}{\mathrm d t},$

where τ is torque.

This word is derived from the Latin word rotātum meaning 'that which has rotated'. The term rotatum is not universally recognized but is commonly used. There is not a universally accepted lexicon to indicate the successive derivatives of rotatum, even if sometimes various proposals have been made.

Using the cross product definition of torque, an alternative expression for rotatum is:

$\mathbf{P} = \mathbf{r} \times \frac{\mathrm d \mathbf{F}}{\mathrm d t} + \frac{\mathrm d \mathbf{r}}{\mathrm d t} \times \mathbf{F}.$

Because the rate of change of force is yank $\mathbf{Y}$ and the rate of change of position is velocity $\mathbf{v}$, the expression can be further simplified to:

$\mathbf{P} = \mathbf{r} \times \mathbf{Y} + \mathbf{v} \times \mathbf{F}.$

=== Relationship with power and energy ===
The law of conservation of energy can also be used to understand torque. If a force is allowed to act through a distance, it is doing mechanical work. Similarly, if torque is allowed to act through an angular displacement, it is doing work. Mathematically, for rotation about a fixed axis through the center of mass, the work W can be expressed as

where τ is torque, and θ_{1} and θ_{2} represent (respectively) the initial and final angular positions of the body.

It follows from the work–energy principle that W also represents the change in the rotational kinetic energy E_{r} of the body, given by

where I is the moment of inertia of the body and ω is its angular speed.

Power is the work per unit time, given by

where P is power, τ is torque, ω is the angular velocity, and $\cdot$ represents the scalar product.

Algebraically, the equation may be rearranged to compute torque for a given angular speed and power output. The power injected by the torque depends only on the instantaneous angular speed – not on whether the angular speed increases, decreases, or remains constant while the torque is being applied (this is equivalent to the linear case where the power injected by a force depends only on the instantaneous speed – not on the resulting acceleration, if any).

==== Proof ====
The work done by a variable force acting over a finite linear displacement $s$ is given by integrating the force with respect to an elemental linear displacement $\mathrm{d}\mathbf{s}$

$$W = \int_{s_1}^{s_2} \mathbf{F} \cdot \mathrm{d}\mathbf{s}$$

However, the infinitesimal linear displacement $\mathrm{d}\mathbf{s}$ is related to a corresponding angular displacement $\mathrm{d}\boldsymbol{\theta}$ and the radius vector $\mathbf{r}$ as

$$\mathrm{d}\mathbf{s} = \mathrm{d}\boldsymbol{\theta}\times\mathbf{r}$$

Substitution in the above expression for work, gives
$$W = \int_{s_1}^{s_2} \mathbf{F} \cdot \mathrm{d}\boldsymbol{\theta} \times \mathbf{r}$$

The expression inside the integral is a scalar triple product $\mathbf{F}\cdot\mathrm{d}\boldsymbol{\theta}\times\mathbf{r} = \mathbf{r} \times \mathbf{F} \cdot \mathrm{d}\boldsymbol{\theta}$, but as per the definition of torque, and since the parameter of integration has been changed from linear displacement to angular displacement, the equation becomes

$$W = \int_{\theta _1}^{\theta _2} \boldsymbol{\tau} \cdot \mathrm{d}\boldsymbol{\theta}$$

If the torque and the angular displacement are in the same direction, then the scalar product reduces to a product of magnitudes; i.e., $\boldsymbol{\tau}\cdot \mathrm{d}\boldsymbol{\theta} = \left|\boldsymbol{\tau}\right| \left| \mathrm{d}\boldsymbol{\theta}\right|\cos 0 = \tau \, \mathrm{d}\theta$ giving

$$W = \int_{\theta _1}^{\theta _2} \tau \, \mathrm{d}\theta$$

== Principle of moments ==
The principle of moments, also known as Varignon's theorem (not to be confused with the geometrical theorem of the same name) states that the resultant torques due to several forces applied to about a point is equal to the sum of the contributing torques:
$$\tau = \mathbf{r}_1\times\mathbf{F}_1 + \mathbf{r}_2\times\mathbf{F}_2 + \ldots + \mathbf{r}_N\times\mathbf{F}_N.$$

From this it follows that the torques resulting from N number of forces acting around a pivot on an object are balanced when

$$\mathbf{r}_1\times\mathbf{F}_1 + \mathbf{r}_2\times\mathbf{F}_2 + \ldots + \mathbf{r}_N\times\mathbf{F}_N = \mathbf{0}.$$

== Units ==
Official SI literature indicates the newton-meter as the standard unit for torque, properly denoted using N⋅m; although this is dimensionally equivalent to the joule, which is not used for torque. More explicitly, torque can be interpreted as having the unit N⋅m/rad (equivalently J/rad), since it represents the rate of change of mechanical work with respect to the angular displacement. However, in the International System of Units (SI), the radian is defined as a dimensionless derived unit. Consequently, torque is conventionally expressed simply in newton-metres (N⋅m/1 = N⋅m), even though it is physically distinct from energy.

This interpretation of torque as energy per unit angular displacement (N⋅m/rad) can be verified from the work-torque relationship introduced in the previous section: where W is the mechanical work (J), τ is the torque (N⋅m/rad), θ_{1} and θ_{2} are the initial and final angular positions of the body (rad), respectively, and dθ is an infinitesimal angular displacement (rad)..

In the case of torque, the unit is assigned to a vector in three-dimensional space, whereas for energy, it is assigned to a scalar. Because of the implicit radian and the vector form of the torque, the dimensional equivalence of the newton-meter and the joule does not imply an equivalence of the physical quantities of torque and energy. The dimensional problem is addressed in orientational analysis, which treats the radian as a base unit rather than as a dimensionless unit. Torque has the dimension of force times distance, symbolically T^{−2}L^{2}M, and those fundamental dimensions are the same as that for energy or work.

The traditional imperial units for torque are the pound foot (lbf-ft), or, for small values, the pound inch (lbf-in). In the US, torque is most commonly referred to as the foot-pound (denoted as either lb-ft or ft-lb) and the inch-pound (denoted as in-lb). Practitioners depend on context and the hyphen in the abbreviation to know that these refer to torque and not to energy or moment of mass (as the symbolism ft-lb would properly imply).

=== Conversion to other units ===
A conversion factor may be necessary when using different units of power or torque. For example, if rotational speed (unit: revolution per minute or second) is used in place of angular speed (unit: radian per second), we must multiply by 2π radians per revolution. In the following formulas, P is power, τ is torque, and ν (Greek letter nu) is rotational speed.

$$P = \tau \cdot 2 \pi \cdot \nu$$

Showing units:

$$P _{\rm W} = \tau _{\rm N {\cdot} m} \cdot 2 \pi _{\rm rad/rev} \cdot \nu _{\rm rev/s}$$

Dividing by 60 seconds per minute gives us the following.

$$P _{\rm W} = \frac{ \tau _{\rm N {\cdot} m} \cdot 2 \pi _{\rm rad/rev} \cdot \nu _{\rm rev/min} } {\rm 60 ~s/min}$$

where rotational speed is in revolutions per minute (rpm, rev/min).

Some people (e.g., American automotive engineers) use horsepower (mechanical) for power, foot-pounds (lbf⋅ft) for torque and rpm for rotational speed. This results in the formula changing to:

$$P _{\rm hp} = \frac{ \tau _{\rm lbf {\cdot} ft} \cdot 2 \pi _{\rm rad/rev} \cdot \nu _{\rm rev/min}} {33,000}.$$

The constant below (in foot-pounds per minute) changes with the definition of the horsepower; for example, using metric horsepower, it becomes approximately 32,550.

The use of other units (e.g., BTU per hour for power) would require a different custom conversion factor.

==== Derivation ====
For a rotating object, the linear distance covered at the circumference of rotation is the product of the radius with the angle covered. That is: linear distance = radius × angular distance. And by definition, linear distance = linear speed × time = radius × angular speed × time.

By the definition of torque: torque = radius × force. We can rearrange this to determine force = torque ÷ radius. These two values can be substituted into the definition of power:

$$\begin{align}
\text{power} & = \frac{\text{force} \cdot \text{linear distance}}{\text{time}} \\[6pt]
& = \frac{\left(\dfrac{\text{torque}} r \right) \cdot (r \cdot \text{angular speed} \cdot t)} t \\[6pt]
& = \text{torque} \cdot \text{angular speed}.
\end{align}$$

The radius r and time t have dropped out of the equation. However, angular speed must be in radians per unit of time, by the assumed direct relationship between linear speed and angular speed at the beginning of the derivation. If the rotational speed is measured in revolutions per unit of time, the linear speed and distance are increased proportionately by 2π in the above derivation to give:

$$\text{power} = \text{torque} \cdot 2 \pi \cdot \text{rotational speed}. \,$$

If torque is in newton-metres and rotational speed in revolutions per second, the above equation gives power in newton-metres per second or watts. If Imperial units are used, and if torque is in pounds-force feet and rotational speed in revolutions per minute, the above equation gives power in foot pounds-force per minute. The horsepower form of the equation is then derived by applying the conversion factor 33,000 ft⋅lbf/min per horsepower:

$$\begin{align}
\text{power} & = \text{torque} \cdot 2 \pi \cdot \text{rotational speed} \cdot \frac{\text{ft}{\cdot}\text{lbf}}{\text{min}} \cdot \frac{\text{horsepower}}{33,\!000 \cdot \frac{\text{ft}\cdot\text{lbf}}{\text{min}}} \\[6pt]
& \approx \frac {\text{torque} \cdot \text{RPM}}{5,\!252}
\end{align}$$

because $5252.113122 \approx \frac {33,\!000} {2 \pi}. \,$

== Special cases and other facts ==
=== Moment arm formula ===
Moment arm diagram

A very useful special case, often given as the definition of torque in fields other than physics, is as follows:

$$\tau = (\text{moment arm}) (\text{force}).$$

The construction of the "moment arm" is shown in the figure to the right, along with the vectors r and F mentioned above. The problem with this definition is that it does not give the direction of the torque but only the magnitude, and hence it is difficult to use in three-dimensional cases. If the force is perpendicular to the displacement vector r, the moment arm will be equal to the distance to the centre, and torque will be a maximum for the given force. The equation for the magnitude of a torque, arising from a perpendicular force:

$$\tau = (\text{distance to centre}) (\text{force}).$$

For example, if a person places a force of 10 N at the terminal end of a wrench that is 0.5 m long (or a force of 10 N acting 0.5 m from the twist point of a wrench of any length), the torque will be 5 N⋅m – assuming that the person moves the wrench by applying force in the plane of movement and perpendicular to the wrench.

The torque caused by the two opposing forces F_{g} and −F_{g} causes a change in the angular momentum L in the direction of that torque. This causes the top to precess.

=== Static equilibrium ===
For an object to be in static equilibrium, not only must the sum of the forces be zero, but also the sum of the torques (moments) about any point. For a two-dimensional situation with horizontal and vertical forces, the sum of the forces requirement is two equations: ΣH = 0 and ΣV = 0, and the torque a third equation: Στ = 0. That is, to solve statically determinate equilibrium problems in two-dimensions, three equations are used.

=== Net force versus torque ===
When the net force on the system is zero, the torque measured from any point in space is the same. For example, the torque on a current-carrying loop in a uniform magnetic field is the same regardless of the point of reference. If the net force $\mathbf{F}$ is not zero, and $\boldsymbol{\tau}_1$ is the torque measured from $\mathbf{r}_1$, then the torque measured from $\mathbf{r}_2$ is
$$\boldsymbol{\tau}_2 = \boldsymbol{\tau}_1 + (\mathbf{r}_2 - \mathbf{r}_1) \times \mathbf{F}$$

=== Machine torque ===
Torque curve of a motorcycle ("BMW K 1200 R 2005"). The horizontal axis shows the rotational speed (in rpm) that the crankshaft is turning, and the vertical axis is the torque (in newton-metres) that the engine is capable of providing at that speed.

Torque forms part of the basic specification of an engine: the power output of an engine is expressed as its torque multiplied by the angular speed of the drive shaft. Internal-combustion engines produce useful torque only over a limited range of rotational speeds (typically from around 1,000–6,000 rpm for a small car). One can measure the varying torque output over that range with a dynamometer, and show it as a torque curve. Steam engines and electric motors tend to produce maximum torque close to zero rpm, with the torque diminishing as rotational speed rises (due to increasing friction and other constraints). Reciprocating steam-engines and electric motors can start heavy loads from zero rpm without a clutch.

In practice, the relationship between power and torque can be observed in bicycles: Bicycles are typically composed of two road wheels, front and rear gears (referred to as sprockets) meshing with a chain, and a derailleur mechanism if the bicycle's transmission system allows multiple gear ratios to be used (i.e. multi-speed bicycle), all of which attached to the frame. A cyclist, the person who rides the bicycle, provides the input power by turning pedals, thereby cranking the front sprocket (commonly referred to as chainring). The input power provided by the cyclist is equal to the product of angular speed (i.e. the number of pedal revolutions per minute times 2π) and the torque at the spindle of the bicycle's crankset. The bicycle's drivetrain transmits the input power to the road wheel, which in turn conveys the received power to the road as the output power of the bicycle. Depending on the gear ratio of the bicycle, a (torque, angular speed)_{input} pair is converted to a (torque, angular speed)_{output} pair. By using a larger rear gear, or by switching to a lower gear in multi-speed bicycles, angular speed of the road wheels is decreased while the torque is increased, product of which (i.e. power) does not change.

=== Torque multiplier ===
Torque can be multiplied via three methods: by locating the fulcrum such that the length of a lever is increased; by using a longer lever; or by the use of a speed-reducing gearset or gear box. Such a mechanism multiplies torque, as rotation rate is reduced.

== See also ==
- Moment
- Bending moment
- Friction torque
- Mechanical equilibrium
- Orders of magnitude (torque)
- Rigid body dynamics
- Statics
- Torque converter
- Torque limiter
- Torque screwdriver
- Torque tester
- Torque wrench
- Torsion (mechanics)

Linear/translational quantities				Angular/rotational quantities			
Dimensions	1	L	L^{2}	Dimensions	1	θ	θ^{2}
T	time: t s	absement: A m s		T	time: t s		
1		distance: d, position: r, s, x, displacement: d m	area: A m^{2}	1		angle: θ, angular displacement: θ rad	solid angle: Ω rad^{2}, sr
T^{−1}	frequency: f s^{−1}, Hz	speed: v, velocity: v m s^{−1}	kinematic viscosity: ν, specific angular momentum: h m^{2} s^{−1}	T^{−1}	frequency: f, rotational speed: n, rotational velocity: n s^{−1}, Hz	angular speed: ω, angular velocity: ω rad s^{−1}	
T^{−2}		acceleration: a m s^{−2}		T^{−2}	rotational acceleration s^{−2}	angular acceleration: α rad s^{−2}	
T^{−3}		jerk: j m s^{−3}		T^{−3}		angular jerk: ζ rad s^{−3}	
M	mass: m kg	weighted position: M ⟨x⟩ = ∑ m x	moment of inertia: I kg m^{2}	ML			
MT^{−1}	Mass flow rate: $\dot{m}$ kg s^{−1}	momentum: p, impulse: J kg m s^{−1}, N s	action: 𝒮, actergy: ℵ kg m^{2} s^{−1}, J s	MLT^{−1}		angular momentum: L, angular impulse: ΔL kg m rad s^{−1}	
MT^{−2}		force: F, weight: F_{g} kg m s^{−2}, N	energy: E, work: W, Lagrangian: L kg m^{2} s^{−2}, J	MLT^{−2}		torque: τ, moment: M kg m rad s^{−2}, N m	
MT^{−3}		yank: Y kg m s^{−3}, N s^{−1}	power: P kg m^{2} s^{−3}, W	MLT^{−3}		rotatum: P kg m rad s^{−3}, N m s^{−1}	
