= The Mathematical Intelligencer =

- Cover of Winter 1994 issue
- Discipline: Mathematics
- Language: English

Publication details
- Publisher: Springer Science+Business Media

Standard abbreviations
- ISO 4: Math. Intell.
- MathSciNet: Math. Intelligencer

Indexing
- ISSN: 0343-6993 (print); 1866-7414 (web)

Links
- Journal homepage

The Mathematical Intelligencer is a mathematical journal published by Springer Science+Business Media that aims at a conversational and scholarly tone, rather than the technical and specialist tone more common among academic journals. Volumes are released quarterly with a subset of open access articles. Some articles have been cross-published in the Scientific American. Karen Parshall and Sergei Tabachnikov are currently the co-editors-in-chief.

== History ==
The journal was started informally in 1971 by Walter Kaufmann-Buehler and Alice and Klaus Peters. "Intelligencer" was chosen by Kaufmann-Buehler as a word that would appear slightly old-fashioned. An exploration of mathematically themed stamps, written by Robin Wilson, became one of its earliest columns. Prior to 1977, articles of the Intelligencer were not contained in regular volumes and were sent out sporadically to those on a mailing list. To gauge interest, the inaugural mailing included twelve thousand people of whom four thousand requested further copies via postcard. One of the latter was André Weil, who mocked the mailing's admittedly idiosyncratic typography.

In 1978, the founders appointed Bruce Chandler and Harold "Ed" Edwards Jr. to serve jointly in the role of editor-in-chief. The volumes started again with 0 (introductory volume in August 1977) and the first issue of volume 1 appeared in March 1978.

Subsequent editors-in-chief were John Ewing from 1979 to 1986, Sheldon Axler from 1987 to 1991, and Chandler Davis from 1991 to 2004. Beginning in 2004, Davis shared editing responsibilities with long-time contributor Marjorie Senechal. She became the sole editor on Davis's retirement in 2013 and continued to edit the journal through the end of 2020. Parshall and Tabachnikov took over from her in 2021.

Almost from the beginning, the journal's editors have shown a “willingness to deal with controversial topics.” For example, Chandler and Edwards excerpted Morris Kline's controversial 1977 book, Why the Professor Can’t Teach, prompting numerous reactions. Their successor, Ewing, acknowledged that “the purpose of the Intelligencer remains the same: to inform, to entertain, and to provoke." Axler was even more categorical: “Controversies can make for interesting reading, especially in mathematics where we rarely argue about the scientific validity of a result. … [They] keep the publication edgy.” Indeed, Axler identified at least three controversies that erupted during his editorship. One was a book review by Steven Krantz in 1989 which expanded to criticize research interest in fractals; "Fractal geometry has not solved any problems. It is not even clear that it has created any new ones." This prompted Benoit Mandelbrot to publish a rebuttal in the same journal. The rebuttal format was initially planned for a paper accepted by Senechal that was authored by Theodore Hill and Sergei Tabachnikov on the variability hypothesis. In the end, however, it was not published. Further controversy arose when a revised version of the paper, by Hill alone, was published by The New York Journal of Mathematics but then retracted without a notice.

== Contents ==
The Mathematical Intelligencer publishes a variety of contributions on and about mathematics. In addition to articles of a strictly mathematical nature, shorter “notes,” poetry, short fiction, and the occasional interview, the journal currently features regular columns on the history of mathematics (“Years Ago” overseen by Jemma Lorenat), humor (“Mathematically Bent” written by Colin Adams), “Mathematical Gems and Curiosities” (edited by Valentin Ovsienko and Sophie Morier-Genoud), “Mathematical Communities” (edited by Marjorie Senechal), “The Mathematical Tourist” (edited by Ma. Louise Antonette De Las Peñas), and mathematics on stamps (“Stamp Corner” edited by Robin Wilson). Long-time contributor, Jim Henle also authored a column on “Cucina Matematica” until 2015 as well as, until 2022, one “For Our Mathematical Pleasure.” Under John McCleary, the book review section covers books, both non-fiction and fiction, of interest to the mathematically inclined.

== Reception ==
The Mathematical Intelligencer has been described as a journal that publishes articles about front-line research rather than research per se. In 2001, Branislav Kisacanin opined that it belongs in "every good mathematics library". Apart from the Intelligencer's main articles, a humor column written by mathematician Colin Adams has also been well received.
