= Lek mating =

Type of animal mating behaviour

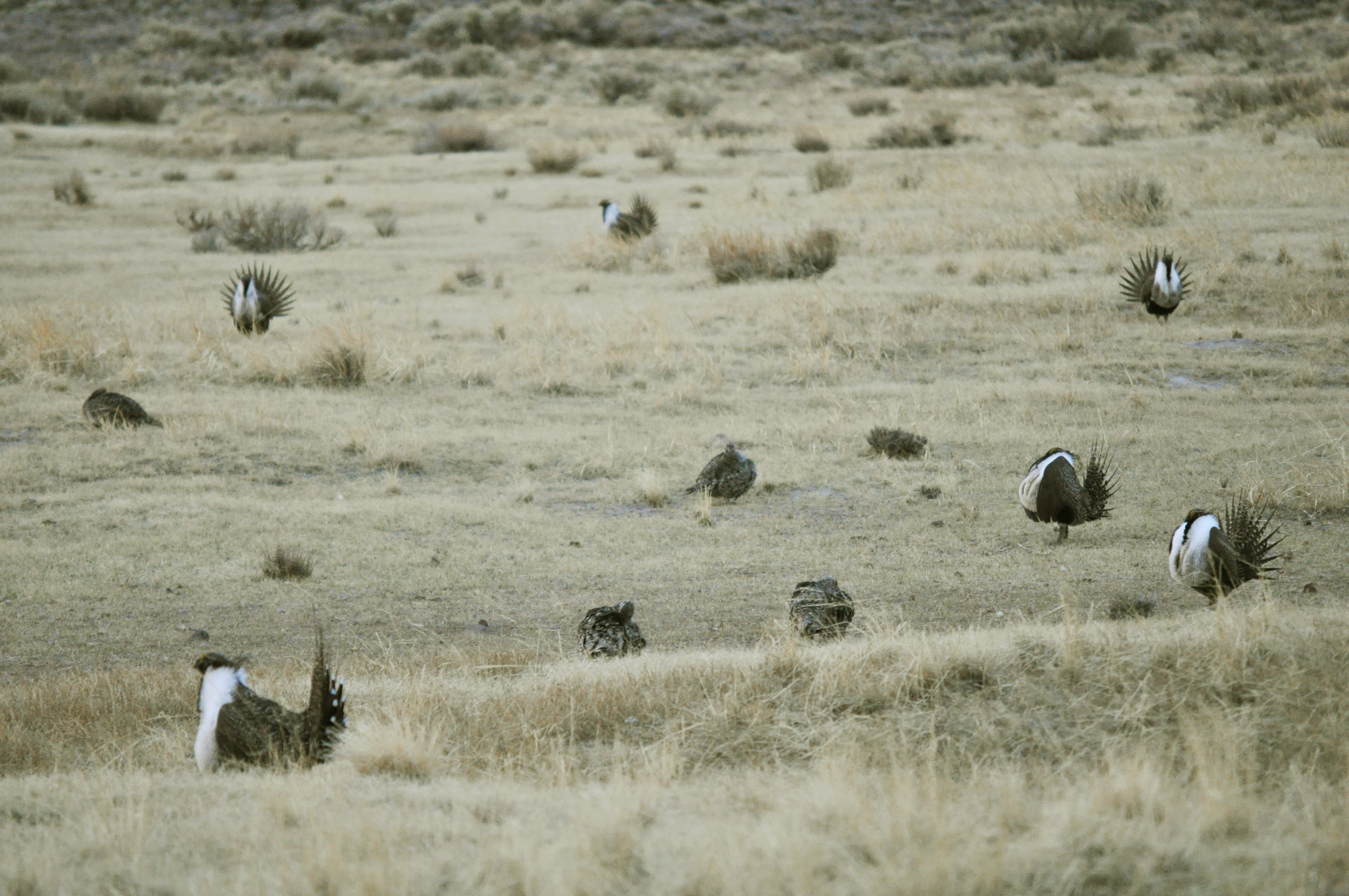
Greater sage-grouse at a lek, with multiple males displaying for the less conspicuous females

A lek is an aggregation of male animals gathered to engage in competitive displays and courtship rituals, known as lekking, to entice visiting females which are surveying prospective partners with which to mate. It can also refer to a space used by displaying males to defend their own share of territory for the breeding season. A lekking species is characterised by male displays, strong female mate choice, and the conferring of indirect benefits to males and reduced costs to females. Although most prevalent among birds such as black grouse, lekking is also found in a wide range of vertebrates including some bony fish, amphibians, reptiles, mammals, and arthropods including crustaceans and insects.

A classical lek consists of male territories in visual and auditory range of each other. An exploded lek, as seen in the kākāpō (the owl parrot), has more widely separated territories, but still in auditory range. Lekking is associated with an apparent paradox: strong sexual selection by females for specific male traits ought to erode genetic diversity by Fisherian runaway, but diversity is maintained and runaway does not occur. Many attempts have been made to explain it away, but the paradox remains.

== Etymology ==
The term derives from the Swedish lek ([leːk]), a noun which typically denotes pleasurable and less rule-bound games and activities ("play", as by children), or from the Swedish verb "leka", to play. Written English use of lek dates from the late 1860s and early 1870s. Llewelyn Lloyd's The Game birds and wild fowl of Sweden and Norway (1867) introduces it (capitalised and in single quotes, as 'Lek') explicitly as a Swedish term.

== Taxonomic range ==
Lekking was originally described in the Tetraonidae (grouse, boldface in cladogram), in particular the black grouse (Swedish: "orrlek") and capercaillie (Swedish: "tjäderlek"), but it is widely distributed phylogenetically among other birds, and in many other animal groups within the vertebrates and the arthropods, as shown in the cladogram.

The presence of a group name means that some species in that group lek; groups with no lekking members are not shown.

- Nephrozoa
  - Deuterostomia
    - Vertebrates
      - Teleosts
        - Atlantic cod
        - - Desert pupfish
          - Cichlids
      - Tetrapoda
        - Amphibians: some frogs
        - Amniota
          - - Reptilia: Marine iguanas
            - Birds
              - **Tetraonidae** (grouse)
              - Neoaves
                - Otididae (bustards)
                - - Scolopacidae (sandpipers)
                  - - Psittacidae (parrots)
                    - Passeriformes
                      - - Cotingidae (cotingas)
                        - Pipridae (manakins)
                      - - - Pycnonotidae (bulbuls)
                          - Ploceidae (weavers)
                        - Paradisaeidae (birds of paradise)
          - Mammals
            - Bats
            - - Bovidae: several species
              - Pinnipeds
  - Protostomia
    - Decapoda: fiddler crab
    - - Insects
        - Hymenoptera
          - Vespidae: paper wasps
          - - Pompilidae: tarantula hawk wasps
            - - Formicidae: some ants
              - Apoidea: some bees
        - - Lepidoptera: some butterflies and moths
          - Diptera: fruit flies, druid flies

There is also evidence from scrape marks left by dinosaurs that suggest they also indulged in leks.

== Lekking behaviour ==
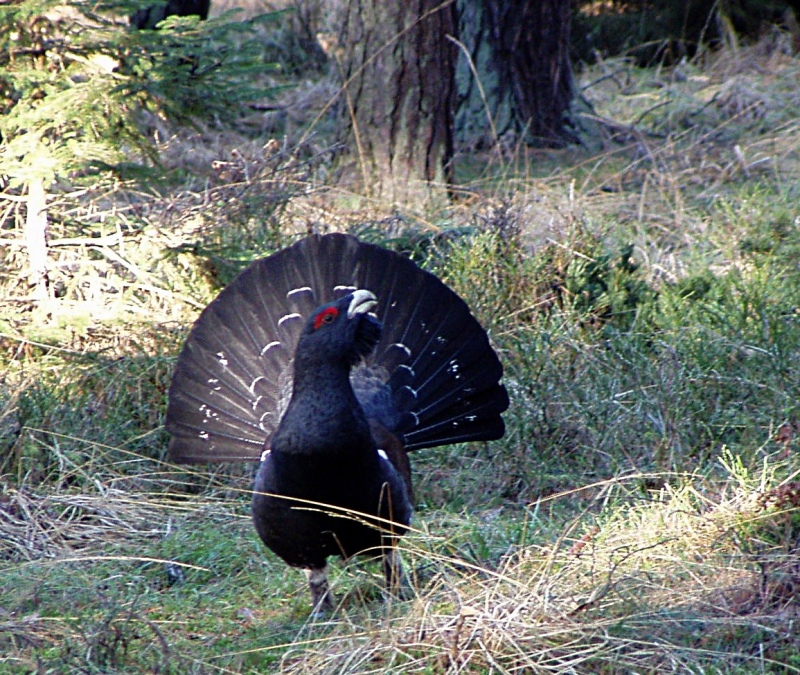
A posing western capercaillie

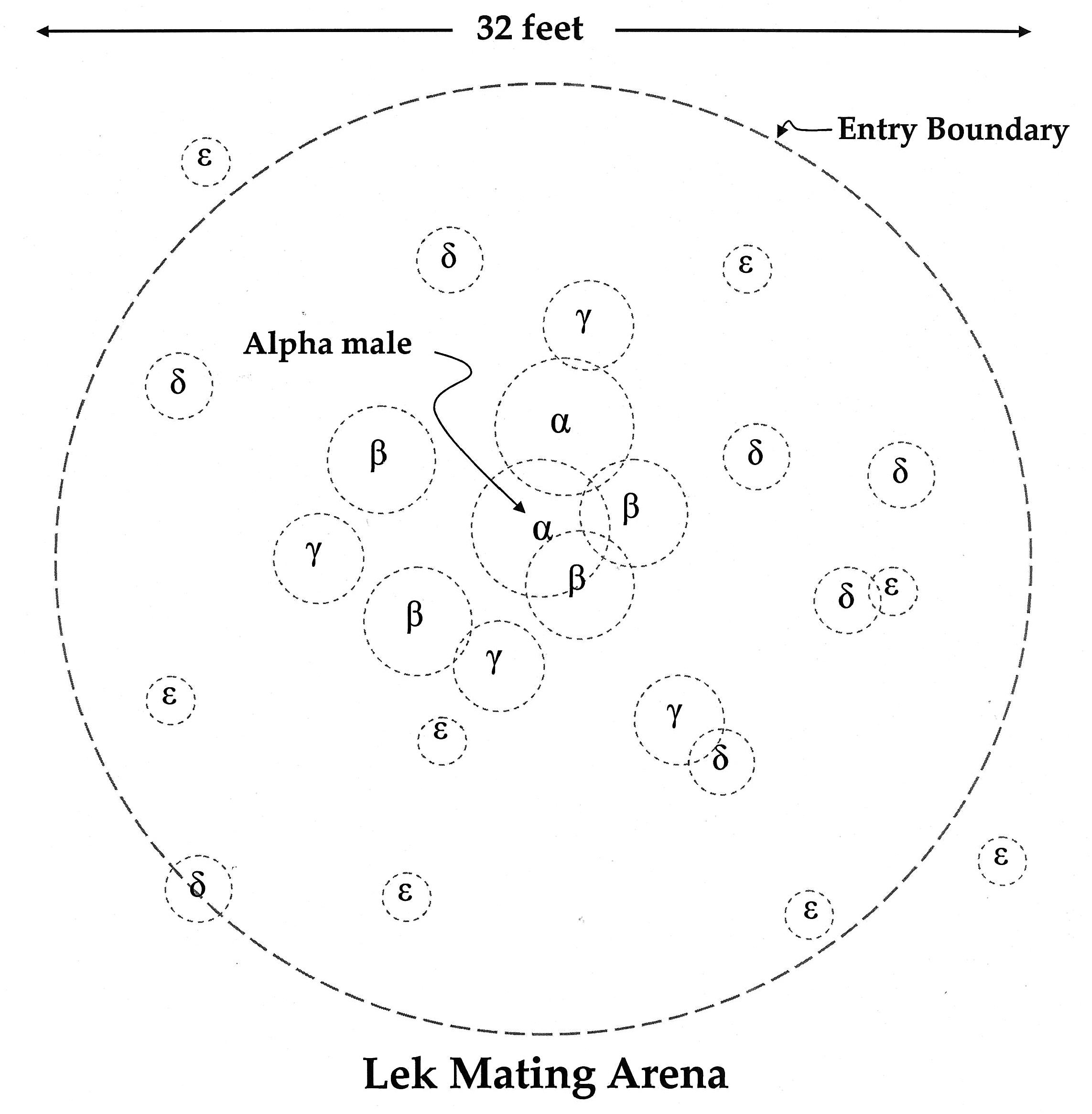
Sage grouse lek mating arena, in which each male, alpha-male (highest ranking), beta-male, gamma-male, etc., guards a territory of a few meters in size. The dominant males may each attract eight or more females. Higher-ranking individuals have larger personal space bubbles. Bird leks may have 10-200 individuals. A strict hierarchy accords the top-ranking males the most prestigious central territories. Females come to choose mates when the males' hierarchy is established, and preferentially mate with the dominants in the centre.

=== Types ===
There are two types of lekking arrangement: classical and exploded. In the classic lekking system, male territories are in visual and auditory range of their neighbours. In an exploded lek, males are further away from one another than they would be in a classical lek. Males in an exploded lek are outside visual range of one another, but they stay within earshot. Exploded lek territories are much larger than classic systems and more variable in size. A well-known example of exploded leks is the "booming" call of the kākāpō, the males of which position themselves many kilometres apart from one another to signal to potential mates.

=== Stability ===
Lek territories of different taxa are stable and do not vary in terms of size and location. Males often return to the same mating sites because of female fidelity. Avian females such as the black grouse and great snipe are faithful to males and not to mating sites. Successful males congregate in the same area as the previous breeding season because it is familiar to them, while females return to reunite with their males. Females do not return to a mating site if their male partner is not present. Another possible explanation for lek stability is from male hierarchies within a lek. In some species of manakin, subordinate betas may inherit an alpha's display site, increasing the chances of female visitation. Rank may also contribute to the stability of lek size, as lower ranking males may congregate to achieve a perceived optimal size to attract females.

=== Female mating preferences ===
A meta analysis of 27 species found that qualities such as lekking size, male display rate, and the rate of male aggression exhibit positive correlation with male success rates. A positive correlation was also found between attendance, magnitude of exaggerated traits, age, frequency of fights, and mating success. This female preference leads to mating skew, with some males being more successful at copulating with females. The variation in mating success is quite large in lek mating systems with 70–80% of matings being attributed to only 10–20% of the males present.

== Costs and benefits ==
Lekking behaviour in the Clusiid fly Paraclusia tigrina

The main benefit for both sexes is mating success. For males, the costs stem from females' preferences. The traits that are selected for may be energetically costly to maintain and may cause increased predation. For example, increased vocalization rate caused a decrease in the mass of male great snipes. Other costs can derive from male combat. For example, male great snipes regularly fight to display dominance or defend their territory, with females preferring victorious males. Aggressive male black grouse are preferred over non-aggressive males and when the males fight they tear feathers from each other's tails. Lekking is associated with sexual dimorphism across a range of bird taxa.

At first glance, it may seem that females receive no direct benefits from lekking, since the males are only contributing genes to the offspring in the absence of parental care or other benefits. However, lekking reduces the cost of female searching because the congregating of males makes mate selection easier. Females do not have to travel as far, since they are able to evaluate and compare multiple males within the same vicinity. Further, having the males in one place may reduce the amount of time a female is vulnerable to predators. When under predatory pressure, female marbled reed frogs consistently choose leks near their release sites; high male calling rates were observed to reduce female search time.

== The lek paradox ==
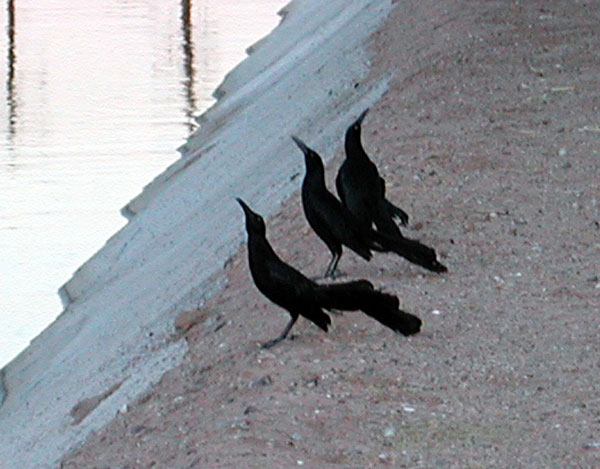
A group of three male great-tailed grackles trying to attract the attention of a receptive female

Since sexual selection by females for specific male trait values should erode genetic diversity, the maintenance of genetic variation in lekking species constitutes a paradox in evolutionary biology. Many attempts have been made to explain it away, but the paradox remains. There are two conditions in which the lek paradox arises. The first is that males contribute only genes and the second is that female preference does not affect fecundity. Female choice should lead to directional runaway selection, resulting in a greater prevalence for the selected traits. Stronger selection should lead to impaired survival, as it decreases genetic variance and ensures that more offspring have similar traits. However, lekking species do not exhibit runaway selection. In a lekking reproductive system, what male sexual characteristics can signal to females is limited, as the males provide no resources to females or parental care to their offspring. This implies that a female gains indirect benefits from her choice in the form of "good genes" for her offspring.

Amotz Zahavi argued that male sexual characteristics only convey useful information to the females if these traits confer a handicap on the male. Zahavi's handicap principle may offer a resolution to the lek paradox, for if females select for the condition of male ornaments, then their offspring have better fitness. Another potential resolution to the lek paradox is Rowe and Houle's theory that sexually selected traits depend on physical condition, which might in turn, summarize many genetic loci. This is the genic capture hypothesis, which describes how a significant amount of the genome is involved in shaping the traits that are sexually selected. There are two assumptions in the genic capture hypothesis: the first is that sexually selected traits are dependent upon condition, and the second is that general condition is attributable to high genetic variance. In addition, W. D. Hamilton and Marlene Zuk proposed that sexually selected traits might signal resistance to parasites. One resolution to the lek paradox involves female preferences and how preference alone does not cause a drastic enough directional selection to diminish the genetic variance in fitness. Another conclusion is that the preferred trait is not naturally selected for or against and the trait is maintained because it implies increased attractiveness to the male.

== Evolution ==
Several possible mechanisms have been proposed as to why males cluster into leks, including the hotshot, hotspot, black hole, kin selection, and predation protection hypotheses, as described below.

=== Hotshot hypothesis ===
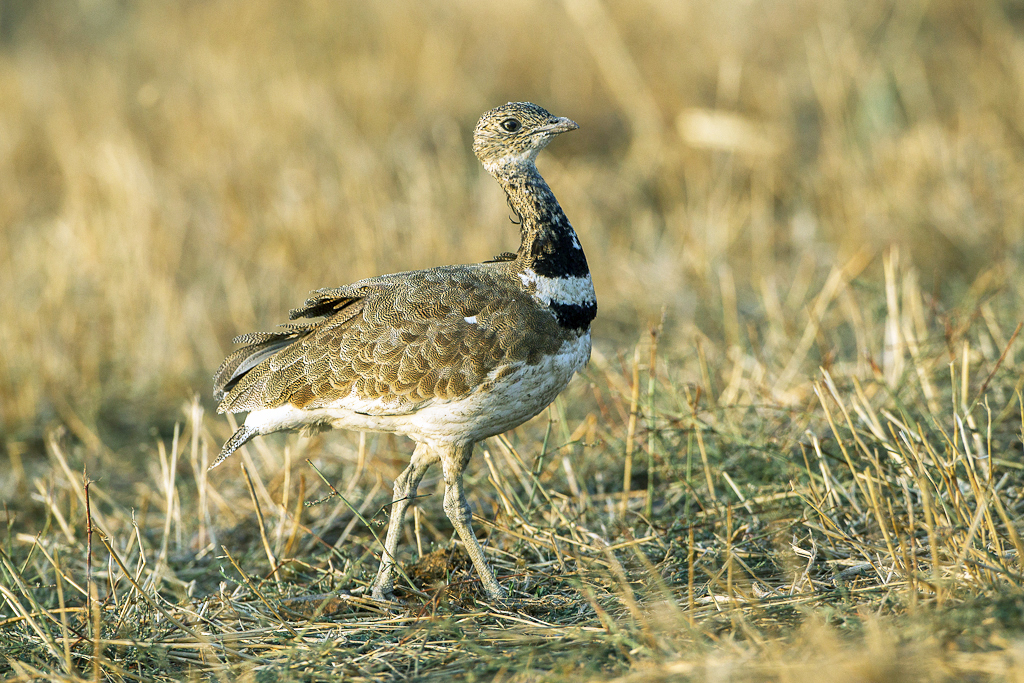
In the little bustard, the presence of a hotshot male seems to attract males and females to the lek.

The hotshot hypothesis is the only model that attributes males as the driving force behind aggregation. The hotshot model hypothesizes that attractive males, known as hotshots, garner both female and male attention. Females go to the hotshots because they are attracted to these males. Other males form leks around these hotshots as a way to lure females away from the hotshot. A manipulative experiment using the little bustard, Tetrax tetrax, was done to test the various lek evolution models. The experiment involved varying the size and sex ratio of leks using decoys. To test whether or not the presence of a hotshot determined lek formation, a hotshot little bustard decoy was placed within a lek. After the fake hotshot was added to the lek, both male and female visitation to the lek increased, giving weight to the hypothesis.

=== Hotspot model ===
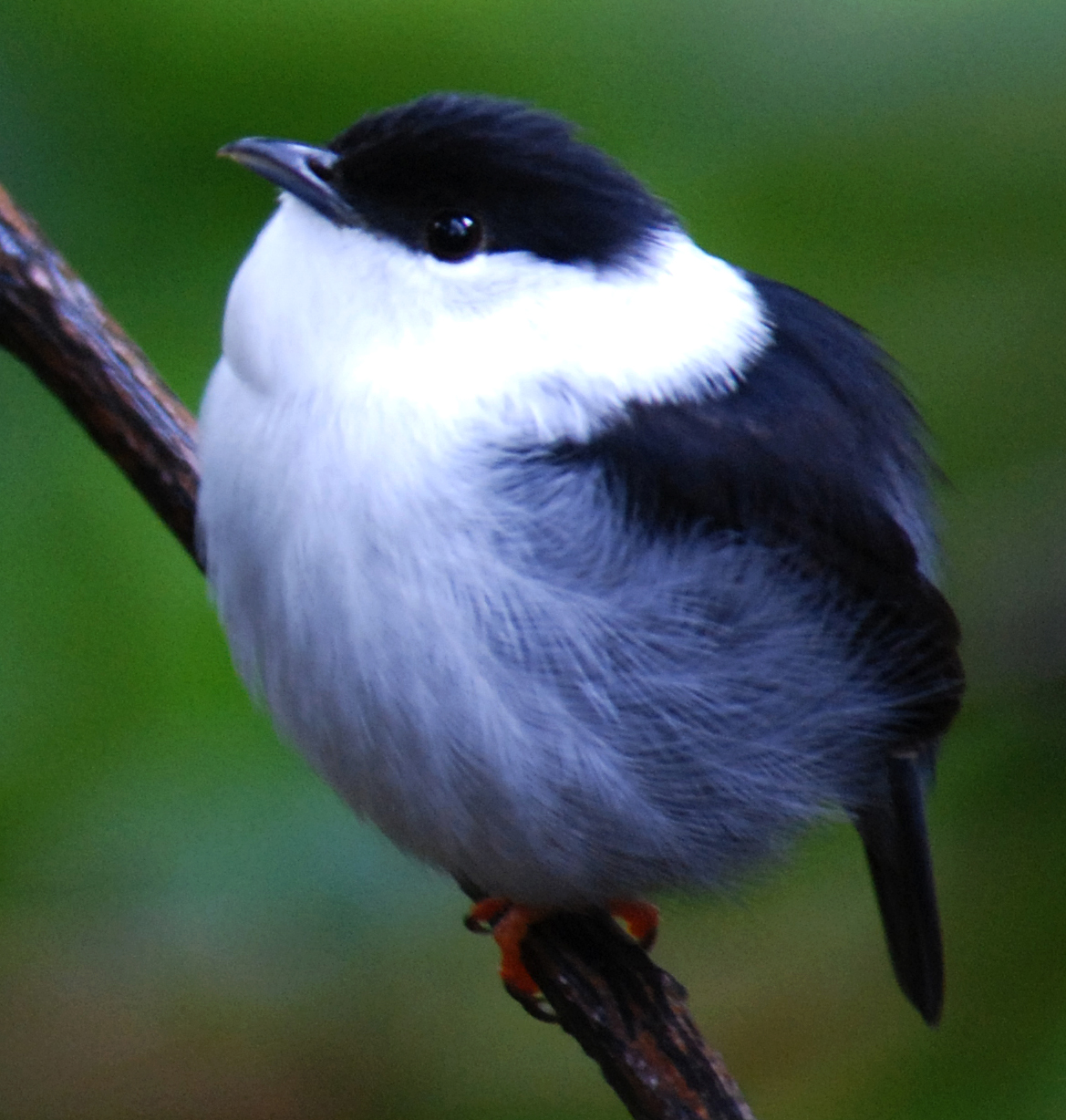
In manakins, males aggregate near hotspots with plentiful fruit, where females tend to go.

The hotspot model considers the female density to be the catalyst for the clustering of males. This model predicts that leks will form where females tend to reside as a way to increase female interaction. Female manakin traffic has been observed to be concentrated around leks, bathing sites, and fruiting areas, with males aggregated near the most visited fruiting resources. The hotspot model also predicts that lek size is dependent upon the number of females inhabiting a patch of land. To test if the number of females affects lek formation, a group of female little bustard decoys were added to a lek. The presence of these female decoys did not have an effect on lek size, tending to refute the hypothesis.

=== Black hole model ===
The black hole model proposes that females have a preference for neither size nor type of male, but rather that females tend to be mobile and mate wherever leks may be located. This model predicts that female mobility is a response to male harassment. This prediction is difficult to test, but there was a negative correlation found between male aggressiveness and female visitation in the little bustard population, suggesting that the model might be correct. Evidence supporting the black hole model is mainly found in ungulates.

=== Kin selection ===
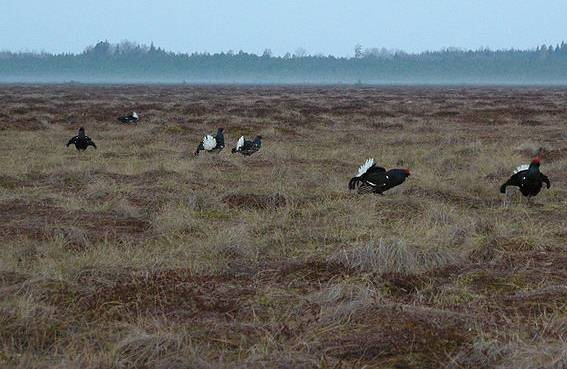
In black grouse, leks are composed of brothers and half-brothers, suggesting a kin selection mechanism.

An alternative hypothesis for lekking is kin selection, which assumes that males within a lek are related to one another. As females rarely mate outside of leks, it is advantageous for males to form leks. Although not all males within a lek mate with a female, the unmated males still receive fitness benefits. Kin selection explains that related males congregate to form leks, as a way to attract females and increase inclusive fitness. In some species, the males at the leks show a high degree of relatedness, but this does not apply as a rule to lek-forming species in general. In a few species such as peacocks and black grouse, leks are composed of brothers and half-brothers. The lower-ranking males gain some fitness benefit by passing their genes on through attracting mates for their brothers, since larger leks attract more females. Peacocks recognize and lek with their brothers, even if they have never met before.

=== Predation protection ===
Another hypothesis is predation protection, or the idea that there is a reduction in individual predation risk in a larger group. This could work both for the males within the group and any female who visits the lek. Protection also explains the presence of mixed leks, when a male of one species joins a lek of another species for protection from a common set of predators. This occurs with manakins, as well as other birds such as grouse species.
