= Norman L. Biggs =

British mathematician

Norman Linstead Biggs (born 2 January 1941) is a British mathematician focusing on discrete mathematics and in particular algebraic combinatorics.

== Education ==
Biggs was educated at Harrow County Grammar School and then studied mathematics at Selwyn College, Cambridge. In 1962, Biggs gained first-class honours in his third year of the university's undergraduate degree in mathematics.

- 1946–1952: Uxendon Manor Primary School, Kenton, Middlesex
- 1952–1959: Harrow County Grammar School
- 1959–1963: Selwyn College, Cambridge (Entrance Exhibition 1959, Scholarship 1961)
- 1960: First Class, Mathematical Tripos Pt. I
- 1962: Wrangler, Mathematical Tripos Pt. II; B.A. (Cantab.)
- 1963: Distinction, Mathematical Tripos Pt. III
- 1988: D.Sc. (London); M.A. (Cantab.)

== Career ==
He was a lecturer at University of Southampton, lecturer then reader at Royal Holloway, University of London, and Professor of Mathematics at the London School of Economics. He has been on the editorial board of a number of journals, including the Journal of Algebraic Combinatorics. He has been a member of the Council of the London Mathematical Society.

He has written 12 books and over 100 papers on mathematical topics, many of them in algebraic combinatorics and its applications. He became Emeritus Professor in 2006 and continues to teach History of Mathematics in Finance and Economics for undergraduates. He is also vice-president of the British Society for the History of Mathematics.

== Family ==
Biggs married Christine Mary Farmer in 1975 and has one daughter Clare Juliet born in 1980.

== Interests and Hobbies ==
Biggs' interests include computational learning theory, the history of mathematics and historical metrology. Since 2006, he has been an emeritus professor at the London School of Economics.

Biggs hobbies consist of writing about the history of weights and scales. He currently holds the position of Chair of the International Society of Antique Scale Collectors (Europe), and a member of the British Numismatic Society.

== Work ==
=== Mathematics ===
In 2002, Biggs wrote the second edition of Discrete Mathematics breaking down a wide range of topics into a clear and organised style. Biggs organised the book into four major sections; The Language of Mathematics, Techniques, Algorithms and Graphs, and Algebraic Methods. This book was an accumulation of Discrete Mathematics, first edition, textbook published in 1985 which dealt with calculations involving a finite number of steps rather than limiting processes. The second edition added nine new introductory chapters; Fundamental language of mathematicians, statements and proofs, the logical framework, sets and functions, and number system. This book stresses the significance of simple logical reasoning, shown by the exercises and examples given in the book. Each chapter contains modelled solutions, examples, exercises including hints and answers.

=== Algebraic Graph Theory ===
In 1974, Biggs published Algebraic Graph Theory which articulates properties of graphs in algebraic terms, then works out theorems regarding them. In the first section, he tackles the applications of linear algebra and matrix theory; algebraic constructions such as adjacency matrix and the incidence matrix and their applications are discussed in depth. Next, there is a wide-ranging description of the theory of chromatic polynomials. The last section discusses symmetry and regularity properties. Biggs makes important connections with other branches of algebraic combinatorics and group theory.

=== Computational Learning Theory ===
In 1997, N. Biggs and M. Anthony wrote a book titled Computational Learning Theory: an Introduction. Both Biggs and Anthony focused on the necessary background material from logic, probability, and complex theory. This book is an introduction to computational learning.

=== History of Mathematics ===
Biggs contributed to thirteen journals and books developing topics such as the four-colour conjecture, the roots/history of combinatorics, calculus, Topology on the 19th century, and mathematicians. In addition, Biggs examined the ideas of William Ludlam, Thomas Harriot, John Arbuthnot, and Leonhard Euler.

== Chip-Firing Game ==
The chip-firing game has been around for less than 20 years. It has become an important part of the study of structural combinatorics. The set of configurations that are stable and recurrent for this game can be given the structure of an abelian group. In addition, the order of the group is equal to the tree number of the graph.

== Publications ==
=== Summary of Biggs' published Books on Mathematics ===
- Finite Groups of Automorphisms, Cambridge University Press (1971)
- Algebraic Graph Theory, Cambridge University Press (1974)
- Graph Theory, 1736–1936 (with E.K. Lloyd and R.J. Wilson), Oxford University Press (1976) (Japanese edition 1986)
- Interaction Models, Cambridge University Press (1977)
- Permutation Groups and Combinatorial Structures (with A.T. White), Cambridge University Press, (1979), (Chinese edition 1988)
- Discrete Mathematics, Oxford University Press (1989) (Spanish edition 1994)
- Introduction to Computing with Pascal, Oxford University Press (1989)
- Computational Learning Theory: an Introduction (with M. Anthony) (1997)
- Algebraic Graph Theory (Second Edition), Cambridge University Press (1993)
- Mathematics for Economics and Finance (with M. Anthony), Cambridge University Press (1996) (Chinese edition 1998; Japanese edition 2000)
- Discrete Mathematics, (Second Edition), Oxford University Press (2002)
- Codes: An Introduction to Information Communication and Cryptography, Springer Verlag (2008)

=== Summary of Biggs' latest published Papers on Mathematics ===
2000

- 'A matrix method for chromatic polynomials – II', CDAM Research Report Series, LSE-CDAM 2000–04, April 2000.
- (with P.Reinfeld), 'The chromatic roots of generalised dodecahedra', CDAM Research Report Series, LSE-CDAM 2000–07, June 2000.

2001

- 'Equimodular curves for reducible matrices', CDAM Research Report Series, LSE-CDAM 2001–01, January 2001.
- 'A matrix method for chromatic polynomials', Journal of Combinatorial Theory, Series B, 82 (2001) 19–29.

2002

- 'Chromatic polynomials for twisted bracelets', Bull. London Math. Soc. 34 (2002) 129–139.
- 'Chromatic polynomials and representations of the symmetric group', Linear Algebra and its Applications 356 (2002) 3–26.
- 'Equimodular curves', Discrete Mathematics 259 (2002) 37–57.

2004

- 'Algebraic methods for chromatic polynomials' (with M H Klin and P Reinfeld), Europ. J. Combinatorics 25 (2004) 147–160.
- 'Specht modules and chromatic polynomials', Journal of Combinatorial Theory, Series B 92 (2004) 359 – 377.

2005

- 'Chromatic polynomials of some families of graphs I: Theorems and Conjectures', CDAM Research Report Series, LSE-CDAM 2005–09, May 2005.

2007

- 'The critical group from a cryptographic perspective', Bull. London Math. Soc., 39 (2007) 829–836.

2008

- 'Chromatic Roots of the Quartic Mobius Ladders', CDAM Research Report LSE-CDAM 2008–05, May 2008.
- 'A Matrix Method for Flow Polynomials', CDAM Research Report LSE-CDAM 2008–08, June 2008.

2009

- 'Tutte Polynomials of Bracelets', CDAM Research Report LSE-CDAM-2009-01, January 2009.
- 'Strongly Regular Graphs with No Triangles', Research Report, September 2009. arXiv:0911.2160v1
- 'Families of Parameters for SRNT Graphs', Research Report, October 2009. arXiv:0911.2455v1

2010

- 'Tutte Polynomials of Bracelets', J. Algebraic Combinatorics 32 (2010) 389–398.
- 'The Second Subconstituent of some Strongly Regular Graphs', Research Report, February 2010. arXiv:1003.0175v1

2011

- 'Some Properties of Strongly Regular Graphs', Research Report, May 2011. arXiv:1106.0889v1

For other published work on the history of mathematics, please see.

== See also ==
- Computational learning theory
- Four color theorem
