= The New York Journal of Mathematics =

- Discipline: Mathematics
- Language: English

Publication details
- Open access: Yes

Standard abbreviations
- ISO 4: N. Y. J. Math.
- MathSciNet: New York J. Math.

Indexing
- ISSN: 1076-9803

Links
- Journal homepage

The New York Journal of Mathematics is a peer-reviewed journal focusing on algebra, analysis, geometry and topology. Its editorial board, as of 2018, consists of 17 university-affiliated scholars in addition to the Editor-in-chief. Articles in the New York Journal of Mathematics are published entirely electronically (on the World Wide Web). The journal uses the diamond open access model—that is, its full content is available to anyone via the Internet, without a subscription or fee.

== History ==
The journal was founded in 1994 by Mark Steinberger who cited a 1993 letter by John Franks as inspiration. At the time of its launch, the New York Journal of Mathematics was the "first electronic general mathematics journal", predating the online versions of both Zentralblatt MATH and the journals in Mathematical Reviews. It was published by the State University of New York at Albany where Steinberger had been a professor since 1987.

Steinberger justified the stylistic choices of the journal by writing, "Some proponents of electronic publication have urged changes in style, citing the low price of disk space as a rationale for publishing articles more loquacious than those commonly acceptable in a print medium. We decided to eschew this route, on the grounds that the perceived quality of our publications would be reduced. We feel it is important to follow the standards of consensus in the field. If these standards change in the future, we will change with them."

When the New York Journal of Mathematics was first published, it was made available via FTP and Gopher for users without a web browser. The papers, typeset in TeX, were originally downloadable in the PostScript format. PDF support was added in 1996. To incorporate hyperlinks within documents, the journal leveraged software that had been developed for the arXiv preprint server.

In 1998, the journal began including links to relevant reviews on MathSciNet with its published articles. It is listed in the Journals section of The Electronic Library of Mathematics. Articles from 2010 and later are available on Web of Science.

A paper on the greater male variability hypothesis by Theodore Hill and Sergei Tabachnikov was accepted but not published by The Mathematical Intelligencer; a later version authored by Hill alone was accepted by The New York Journal of Mathematics and retracted after publication. There was some controversy over the mathematical model and over the retraction of a paper that had passed peer review. This paper was accepted and republished in 2020 by the Journal of Interdisciplinary Mathematics.

== Reception ==
In 2017, the journal had a Mathematical Citation Quotient of 0.56.

In a professional conference presentation, Renzo Piccinini said "An example of what I consider a good electronic journal is the New York Journal of Mathematics; this is a refereed journal--with referees not in the editor's board—with high quality papers and very fast publication time; last, but not least, it is free!"

== See also ==
- List of journals available free online
- List of scientific journals in mathematics
