= Robin Wilson (mathematician) =

British mathematician (born 1943)

The Honourable Robin Wilson
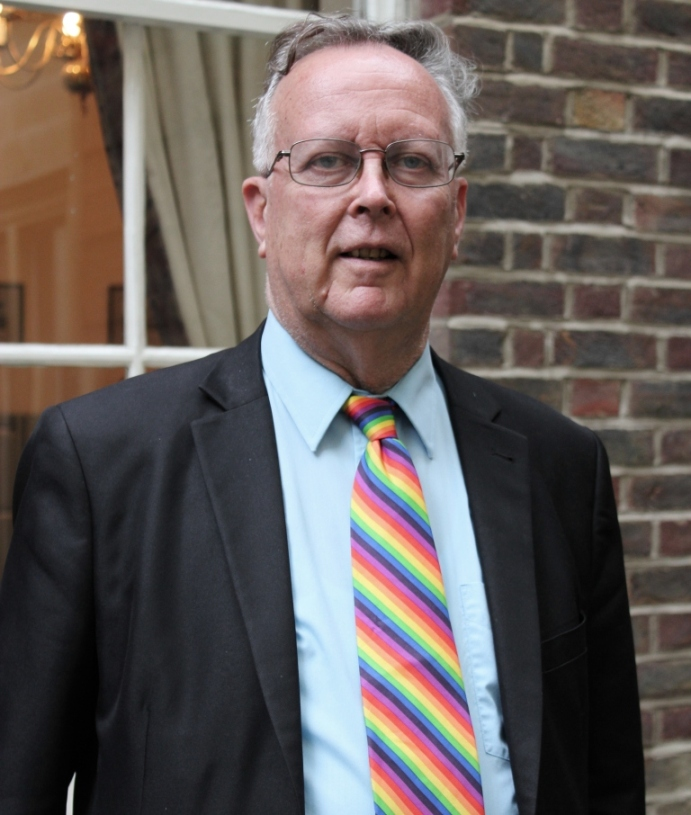
- Wilson in 2011
- Born: Robin James Wilson; 5 December 1943 (age 82); London, England
- Education: Balliol College, Oxford (MA); University of Pennsylvania (MA, PhD)
- Spouse: Joy Crispin (m. 1968)
- Children: 2
- Parent(s): Harold Wilson; Mary Baldwin
- Scientific career
- Fields: Graph theory
- Workplaces: Open University; University of Oxford; Gresham College
- Doctoral advisor: Nesmith Ankeny
- Doctoral students: Amanda Chetwynd

Robin James Wilson (born 5 December 1943) is an English mathematician. He is an emeritus professor in the Department of Mathematics at the Open University, having previously been head of the Pure Mathematics Department and dean of the Faculty. He was a stipendiary lecturer at Pembroke College, Oxford and, from 2004 to 2008, Gresham Professor of Geometry at Gresham College, London. On occasion, he teaches at Colorado College in the United States. He is also a long standing fellow of Keble College, Oxford.

Professor Wilson is a son of former British Prime Minister Harold Wilson and his wife, Mary.

== Early life and education ==
Wilson was born in 1943 to the politician Harold Wilson, who later became Prime Minister, and his wife the poet Mary Wilson (née Baldwin). He has a younger brother, Giles, who in his 50s gave up a career as a teacher to be a train driver. Wilson attended University College School in Hampstead, North London. He achieved a BA first class honours in Mathematics from Balliol College, Oxford, an MA from the University of Pennsylvania, and a PhD from the University of Pennsylvania (1965–1968). In a Guardian interview in 2008, Wilson spoke of the fact he grew up known to everyone primarily as a son of the Labour Party leader and Prime Minister Harold Wilson: "I hated the attention and I still dislike being introduced as Harold Wilson's son. I feel uncomfortable talking about it to strangers even now."

== Mathematics career ==
Wilson's academic interests lie in graph theory, particularly in colouring problems, e.g. the four colour problem, and algebraic properties of graphs. He also researches the history of mathematics, particularly British mathematics and mathematics in the 17th century and the period 1860 to 1940, and the history of graph theory and combinatorics.

In 1974, he won the Lester R. Ford Award from the Mathematical Association of America for his expository article An introduction to matroid theory. Due to his collaboration on a 1977 paper with the Hungarian mathematician Paul Erdős, Wilson has an Erdős number of 1.

In July 2008, Wilson published a study of the mathematical work of Lewis Carroll, the creator of Alice's Adventures in Wonderland and Through the Looking-Glass — Lewis Carroll in Numberland: His Fantastical Mathematical Logical Life (Allen Lane, 2008. ISBN 978-0-7139-9757-6). From January 1999 to September 2003, he was editor-in-chief of the European Mathematical Society Newsletter and in 2003–2008 an associate editor. He is past president of the British Society for the History of Mathematics.

Since 1985, Wilson has edited the mathematics on stamps "Stamp Corner" column for The Mathematical Intelligencer.

== Other interests ==
He has strong interests in music, including the operas of Gilbert and Sullivan, and is the co-author (with Frederic Lloyd) of Gilbert and Sullivan: The Official D'Oyly Carte Picture History. In 2007, he was a guest on Private Passions, the biographical music discussion programme on BBC Radio 3.

== Personal life ==
Wilson is married and has twin daughters.

== Publications ==
Wilson has written or edited about thirty books, including popular books on sudoku and the four colour theorem:

- Oxford's Savilian Professors of Geometry: The First 400 Years (editor), Oxford University Press, 2022: ISBN 978-0-19-886903-0
- Number Theory: A Very Short Introduction, Oxford University Press, 2020: ISBN 978-0-19-879809-5
- The Turing Guide (with Jack Copeland, Jonathan Bowen, Mark Sprevak, et al.), Oxford University Press, 2017: ISBN 978-0198747826 (hardcover), ISBN 978-0198747833 (paperback)
- Combinatorics: A Very Short Introduction, Oxford University Press, 2016: ISBN 978-0-19-872349-3
- Combinatorics: Ancient & Modern (with John Watkins), Oxford University Press, 2013: ISBN 0-19-965659-2
- The Great Mathematicians (with Raymond Flood), Arcturus Publishing Ltd, 2011: ISBN 1-84837-902-1
- Lewis Carroll in Numberland: His Fantastical Mathematical Logical Life, Allen Lane, 2008: ISBN 978-0-7139-9757-6
- Hidden Word Sudoku, Infinite Ideas Limited 2005: ISBN 1-904902-74-X
- How to Solve Sudoku, Infinite Ideas Limited 2005: ISBN 1-904902-62-6
- Sherlock Holmes in Babylon and Other Tales of Mathematical History (co-edited with Marlow Anderson and Victor J. Katz), The Mathematical Association of America, 2004: ISBN 0-88385-546-1
- Mathematics and Music: From Pythagoras to Fractals (co-edited with John Fauvel & Raymond Flood), Oxford University Press, 2003: ISBN 0-19-851187-6
- Four Colours Suffice: How the Map Problem Was Solved, Allen Lane (Penguin), 2002: ISBN 0-7139-9670-6
- Stamping through Mathematics, Springer, 2001: ISBN 0-387-98949-8
- Oxford Figures: 800 Years of the Mathematical Sciences (with John Fauvel & Raymond Flood), Oxford: Clarendon Press, 2000: ISBN 0-19-852309-2
- Graphs and Applications: An Introductory Approach (with Joan Aldous), Springer, 2000: ISBN 1-85233-259-X
- Mathematical Conversations: Selections from the Mathematical Intelligencer (with J. Gray), Springer, 2000: ISBN 0-387-98686-3
- An Atlas of Graphs (with Ronald Read), Oxford: Clarendon Press, 1998: ISBN 0-19-853289-X (paperback edition, 2002: ISBN 0-19-852650-4)
- Graph Theory, 1736–1936 (with Norman L. Biggs and Keith Lloyd), Oxford: Clarendon Press, 1976: ISBN 0-19-853901-0
