= Dubins–Schwarz theorem =

In the theory of martingales, the Dubins–Schwarz theorem (or Dambis–Dubins–Schwarz theorem) is a theorem that says all continuous local martingales and martingales are time-changed Brownian motions.

The theorem was proven in 1965 by Lester Dubins and Gideon E. Schwarz and independently in the same year by K. E. Dambis, a doctoral student of Eugene Dynkin.

== Dubins–Schwarz theorem ==
Let

- $\mathcal{M}_{0,\operatorname{loc}}^{c}$ be the space of $\mathcal{F}_t$-adapted continuous local martingales $M=(M_t)_{t\geq 0}$ with $M_0=0$.
- $\langle M\rangle$ be the quadratic variation.

=== Statement ===
Let $M\in \mathcal{M}_{0,\operatorname{loc}}^{c}$ and $\langle M\rangle_{\infty}=\infty$ and define for all $t\geq 0$ the time-changes (i.e. stopping times)

$$T_t=\inf \{s:\langle M\rangle_s>t\}.$$

Then $B:=(B_t):=(M_{T_t})$ is a $\mathcal{F}_{T_t}$-Brownian motion and $(M_t)=(B_{\langle M\rangle_t})$.

=== Remarks ===
- The condition $\langle M\rangle_{\infty}=\infty$ guarantees that the underlying probability space is rich enough so that the Brownian motion exists. If one removes this conditions one might have to use enlargement of the filtered probability space.
- $B$ is not a $\mathcal{F}_{t}$-Brownian motion.
- $(T_t)$ are almost surely finite since $\langle M\rangle_{\infty}=\infty$.
