= Graph Theory, 1736–1936 =

1976 mathematics text

- Editor: Norman L. Biggs, E. Keith Lloyd, Robin J. Wilson
- Publisher: Clarendon Press
- Publication date: 1976

Graph Theory, 1736–1936 is a book in the history of mathematics on graph theory. It focuses on the foundational documents of the field, beginning with the 1736 paper of Leonhard Euler on the Seven Bridges of Königsberg and ending with the first textbook on the subject, published in 1936 by Dénes Kőnig. Graph Theory, 1736–1936 was edited by Norman L. Biggs, E. Keith Lloyd, and Robin J. Wilson, and published in 1976 by the Clarendon Press. The Oxford University Press published a paperback second edition in 1986, with a corrected reprint in 1998.

== Topics ==
Graph Theory, 1736–1936 contains copies, extracts, and translations of 37 original sources in graph theory, grouped into ten chapters and punctuated by commentary on their meaning and context. It begins with Euler's 1736 paper "Solutio problematis ad geometriam situs pertinentis" on the seven bridges of Königsberg (both in the original Latin and in English translation) and ending with Dénes Kőnig's book Theorie der endlichen und unendlichen Graphen. The source material touches on recreational mathematics, chemical graph theory, the analysis of electrical circuits, and applications of graph theory in abstract algebra. Also included are background material and portraits on the mathematicians who originally developed this material.

The chapters of the book organize the material into topics within graph theory, rather than being strictly chronological. The first chapter, on paths, includes maze-solving algorithms as well as Euler's work on Euler tours. Next, a chapter on circuits includes material on knight's tours in chess (a topic that long predates Euler), Hamiltonian cycles, and the work of Thomas Kirkman on polyhedral graphs. Next follow chapters on spanning trees and Cayley's formula, chemical graph theory and graph enumeration, and planar graphs, Kuratowski's theorem, and Euler's polyhedral formula. There are three chapters on the four color theorem and graph coloring, a chapter on algebraic graph theory, and a final chapter on graph factorization. Appendices provide a brief update on graph history since 1936, biographies of the authors of the works included in the book, and a comprehensive bibliography.

== Audience and reception ==
Reviewer Ján Plesník names the book the first ever published on the history of graph theory, and although Hazel Perfect notes that parts of it can be difficult to read, Plesník states that it can also be used as "a self-contained introduction" to the field, and Edward Maziarz suggests its use as a textbook for graph theory courses. Perfect calls the book "fascinating ... full of information", thoroughly researched and carefully written, and Maziarz finds inspiring the ways in which it describes serious mathematics as arising from frivolous starting points. Fernando Q. Gouvêa calls it a "must-have" for anyone interested in graph theory, and Philip Peak also recommends it to anyone interested more generally in the history of mathematics.
