= Mathematics on stamps =

Depiction of mathematical topics on postage stamps

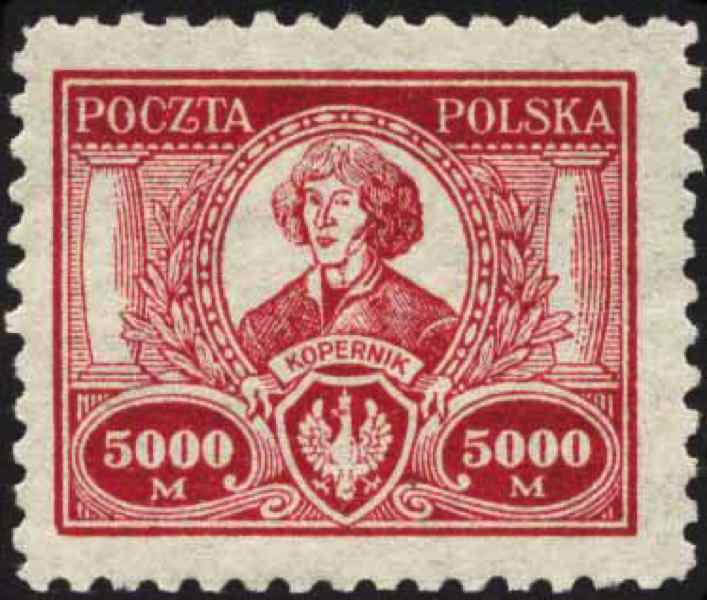
Nicolaus Copernicus, Poland, 1923

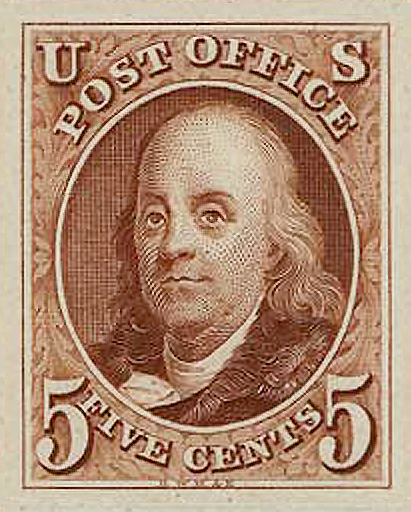
Benjamin Franklin, USA, 1847

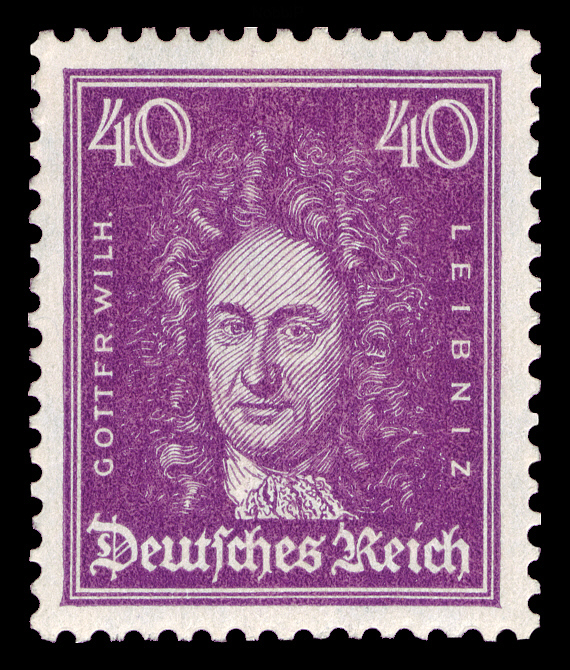
Gottfried Wilhelm Leibniz, Germany, 1926

The depiction of mathematics on stamps began in 1923 with the issue of a set of three Polish stamps commemorating the 450th birth anniversary of the astronomer and mathematician Nicolaus Copernicus. As the definition of what constitutes a valid mathematical stamp is not universally agreed, some collectors make the case that the first mathematical stamp was the 1847 United States issue depicting the polymath Benjamin Franklin even though he was not primarily a mathematician; others prefer to recognize the 1926 German Leibniz stamp as the first depicting a mathematician.

The total number of mathematical stamps that have been issued is approximately 1,600 as of 2024.

== Definition ==
A mathematical stamp has one or more of the following characteristics:

- It depicts a mathematician, or a polymath with a significant mathematical output
- It depicts a mathematical concept or mathematical object
- It depicts a mathematical symbol, formula or notation
- It commemorates a mathematical event such as a national or international congress, or an International Mathematical Olympiad
- It depicts the process of mathematics education, or a building used primarily for mathematical research or education

Stamps illustrating applied mathematics such as astronomy, ballistics, cartography, crystallography, mathematical art, mathematical games, navigation, perspective in art and spaceflight may or may not be included in a mathematical stamp collection depending on the breadth of view of the collector. Typically such stamps may depict a mathematically related object or instrument, e.g. an astrolabe or a slide rule.

The following types of material are excluded (although they may also be collected by mathematical stamp enthusiasts):

- Postal stationery, e.g. a postcard depicting a mathematician with a non-mathematical stamp affixed
- Cinderella, local, private or personal issues, i.e. unofficial stamps
- Non-postal stamps, e.g. revenue stamps
- Stamps issued by non-existing/unrecognized countries and/or in excess of actual postal requirements

== Examples ==
=== Mathematicians ===
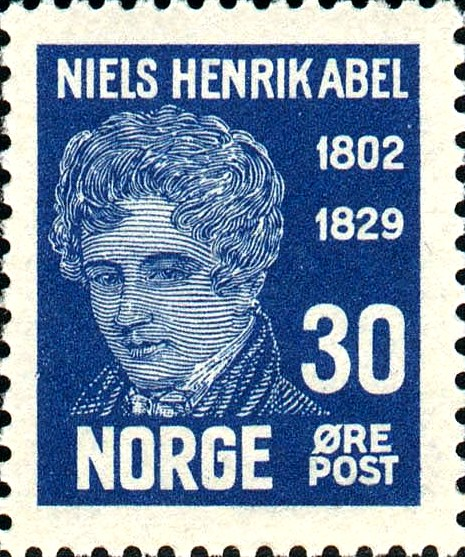
Niels Henrik Abel, Norway, 1929

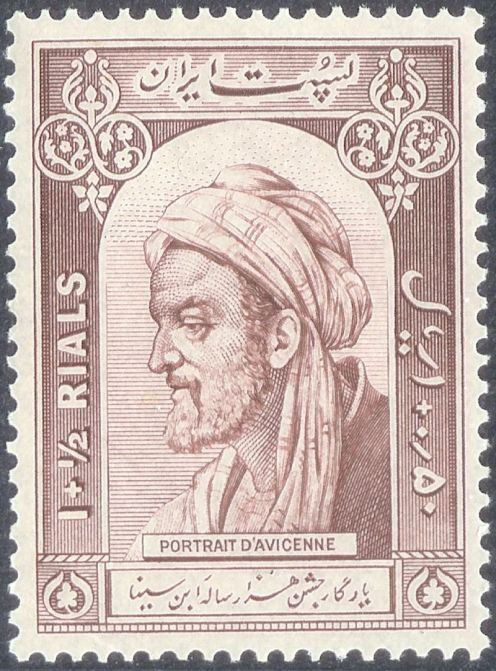
Avicenna, Iran, 1950

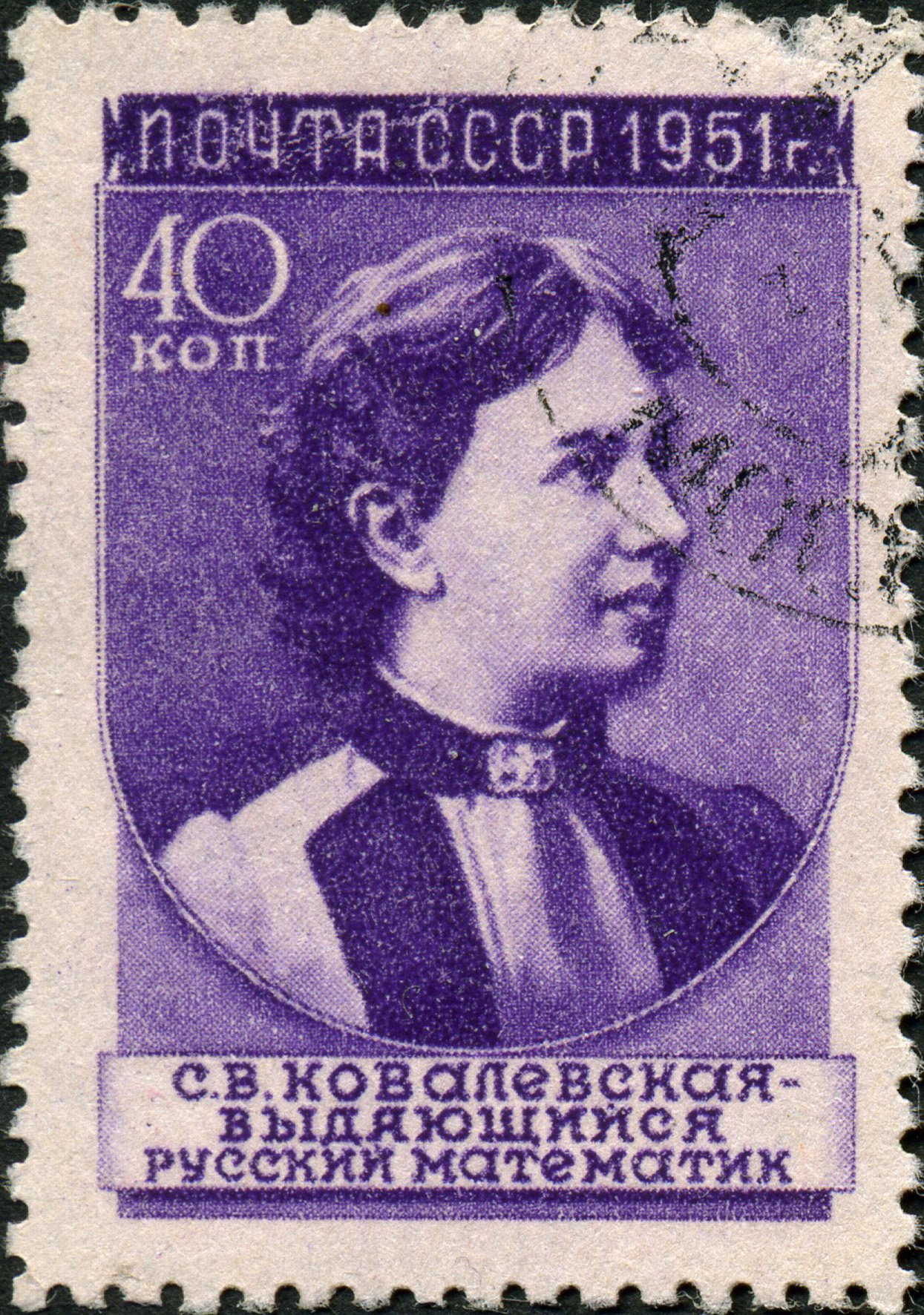
Sofya Kovalevskaya, USSR, 1951

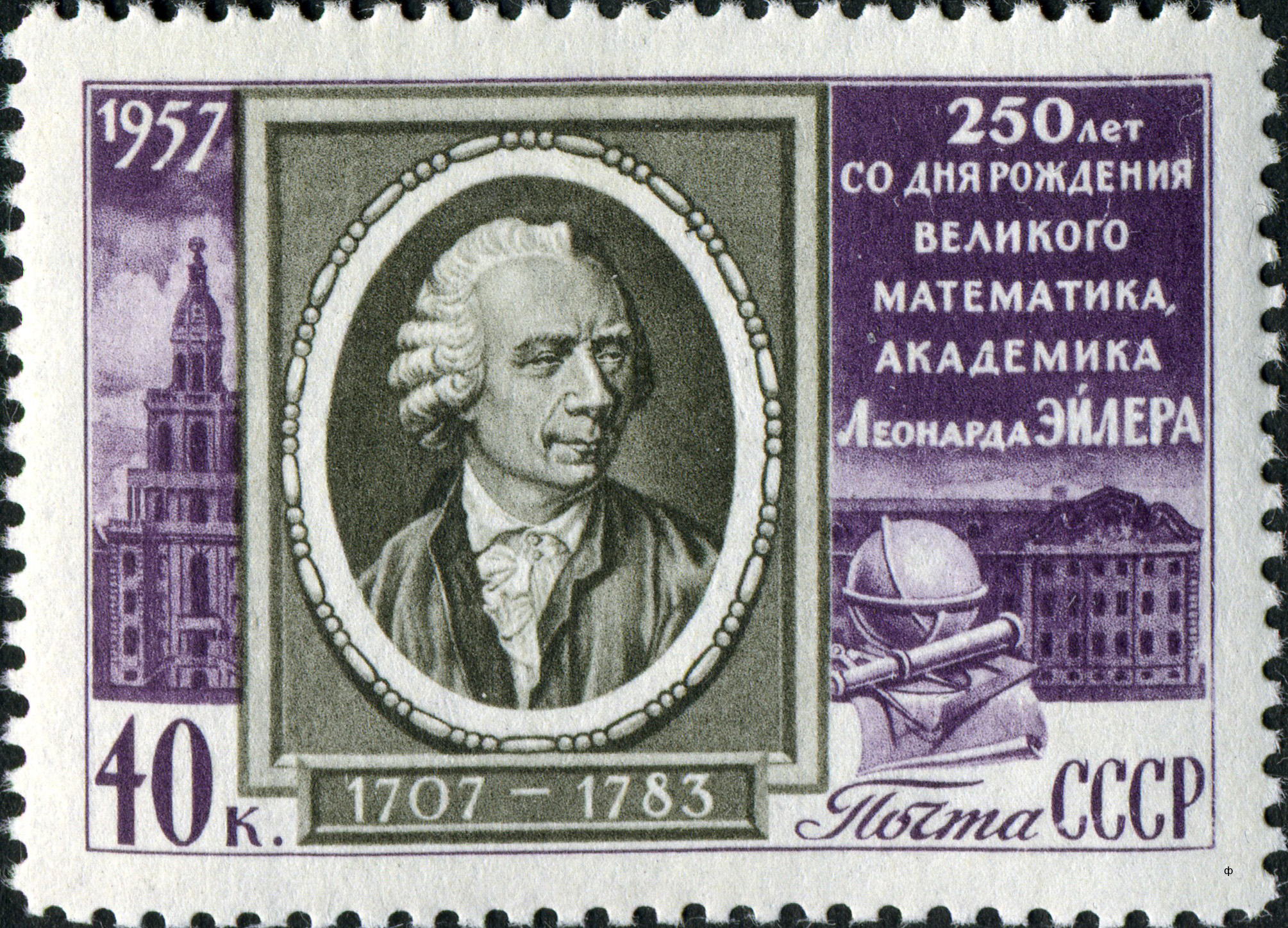
Leonhard Euler, USSR, 1957

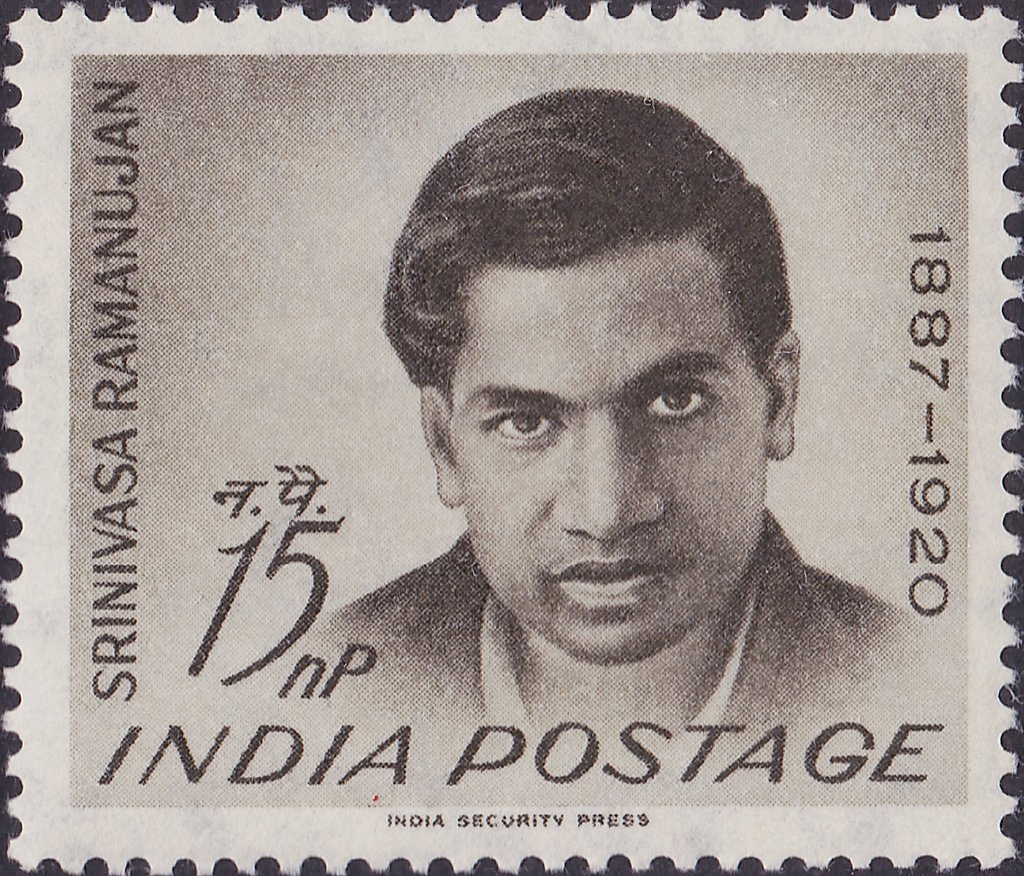
Srinivasa Ramanujan, India, 1962

Stamps depicting individual mathematicians are often issued by countries to commemorate the birth or death anniversaries of their significant national mathematicians, for example stamps issued by Norway celebrating Niels Henrik Abel. Examples are illustrated in the gallery above. Some countries have also issued stamps depicting internationally famous mathematicians such as Isaac Newton or Albert Einstein.

=== Mathematical concepts and objects ===
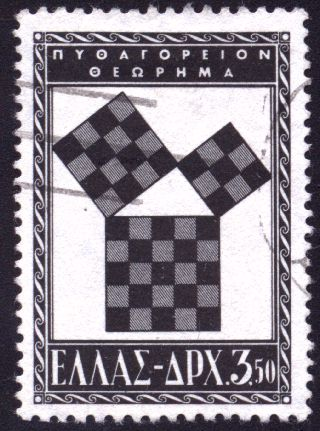
Pythagorean theorem, Greece, 1955

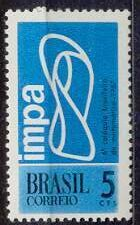
Möbius strip, Brazil, 1967

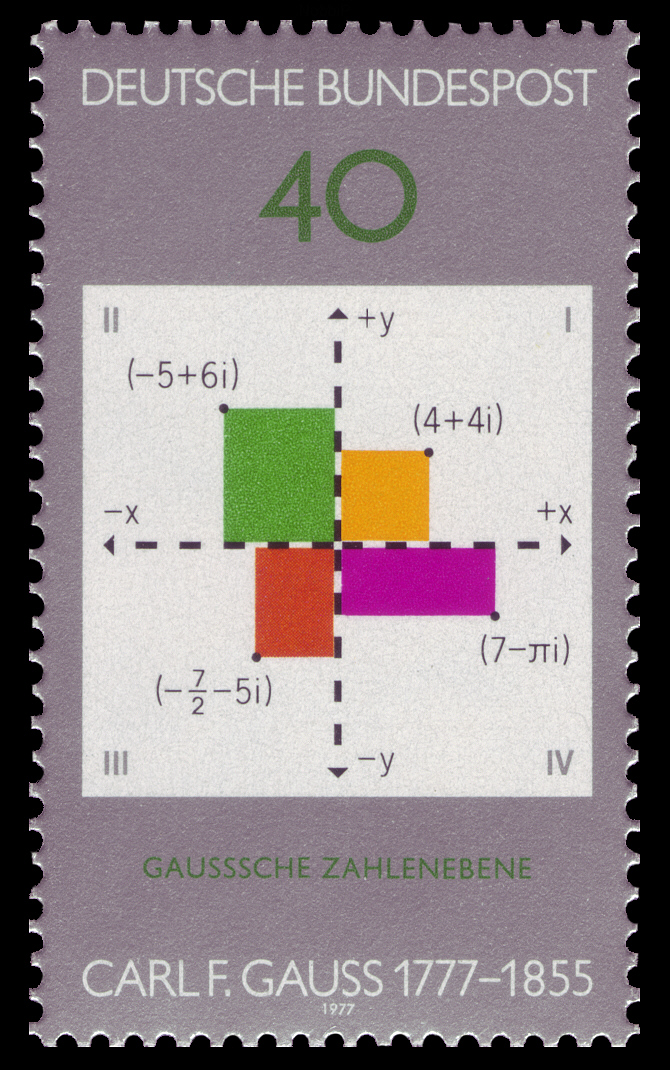
Complex plane, West Germany, 1977

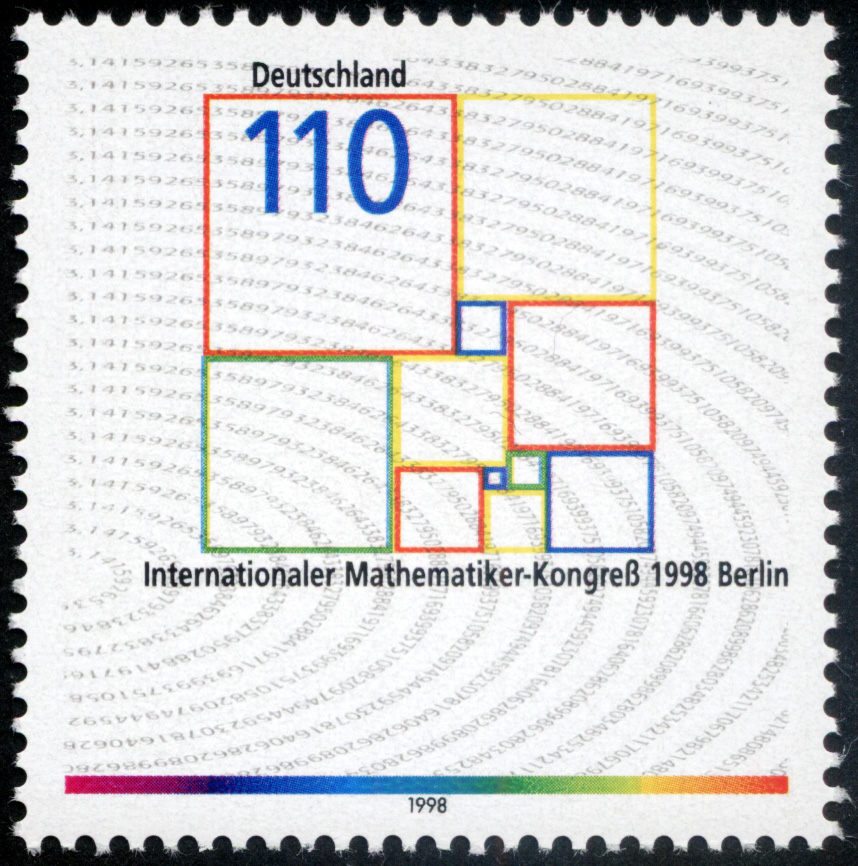
Squaring a rectangle, Germany, 1998

Stamps depicting a mathematical concept or object, sometimes combined with a portrait of the mathematician responsible for inventing the concept or object, are generally issued as commemorative stamps rather than definitive stamps. Examples are shown in the gallery above: a 1955 Greek stamp illustrating the Pythagorean theorem, a 1967 Brazilian stamp illustrating a Möbius strip and also commemorating the 6th Brazilian mathematical congress, a 1977 West German stamp illustrating the complex plane and also commemorating the 200th birth anniversary of Carl Gauss, and a 1998 German stamp illustrating squaring a rectangle and also commemorating an International Mathematical Congress.

=== Mathematical symbols and formulae ===
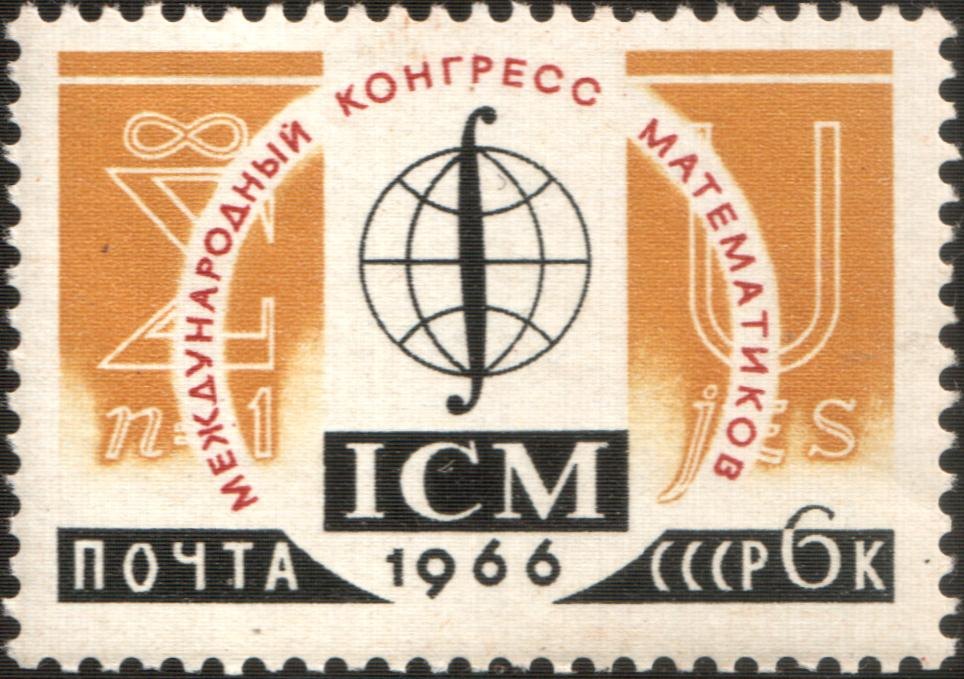
International Congress of Mathematicians, USSR, 1966

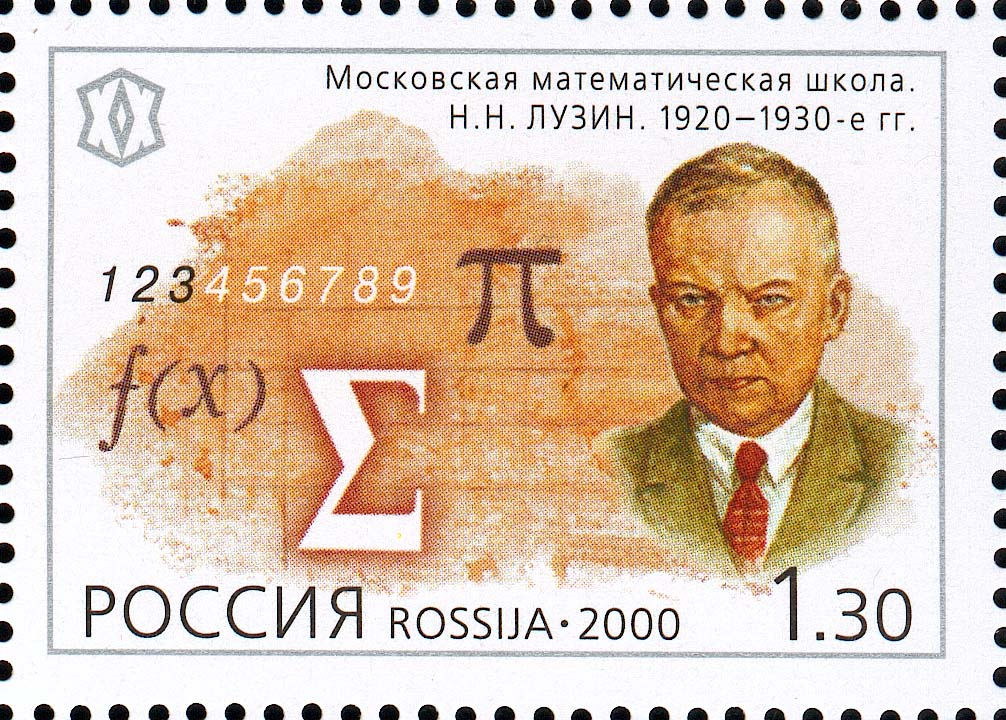
Nikolai Luzin, Russia, 2000

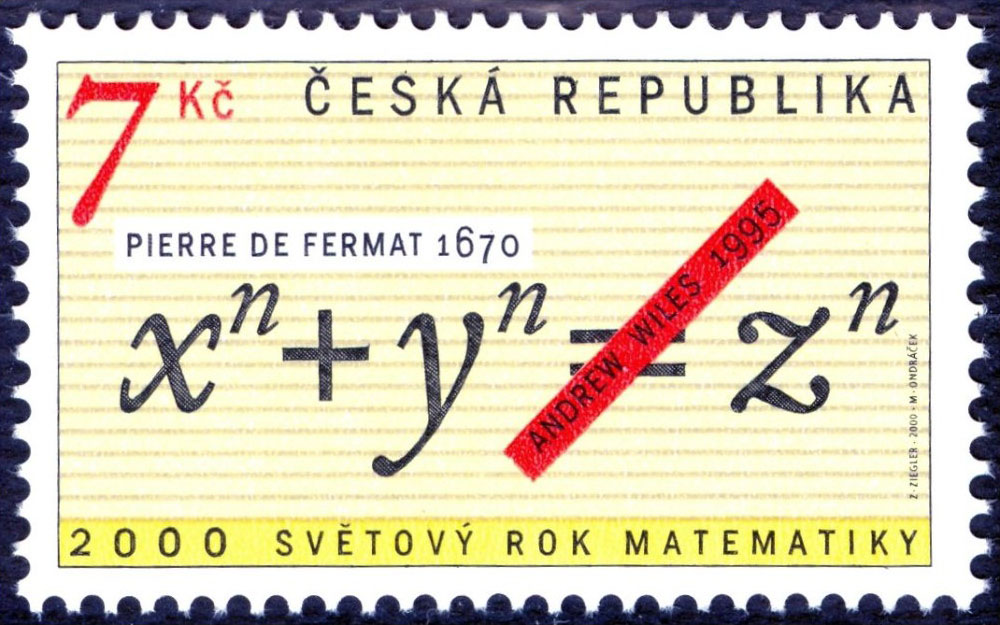
Fermat's Last Theorem, Czech Republic, 2000

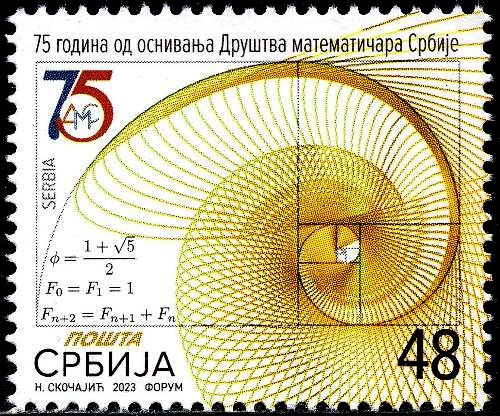
Fibonacci sequence, Serbia, 2023

Stamps depicting a mathematical symbol or formula are frequently depicted together with the mathematician they are primarily associated with. Examples are shown in the gallery above: a 1966 Soviet stamp illustrating the integral, summation and union symbols and also commemorating an International Mathematical Congress, a 2000 Russian stamp illustrating the pi, function and summation symbols and commemorating the life of Nikolai Luzin, a 2000 Czech stamp illustrating Fermat's Last Theorem and commemorating Andrew Wiles's 1995 proof, and a 2023 Serbian stamp illustrating the Fibonacci sequence and commemorating the 75th anniversary of the Mathematical Society of Serbia.

== Publications ==
Robin J. Wilson is the leading writer in the field having published a well-reviewed book entitled Stamping through mathematics in 2001, a paper on European mathematical history through stamps, and also contributing the Stamp Corner column to The Mathematical Intelligencer starting in 1984.

William L. Schaaf published a paper, later expanded into a book entitled Mathematics and science: an adventure in postage stamps in 1978. From 1979 until at least 2011 the Mathematical Study Unit of the American Topical Association published Philamat: A journal of mathematical philately but this organization is no longer part of the ATA as of 2024. A sample issue is available online.

Listings of new issues of mathematical stamps are included in the monthly Scott Stamp magazine and in Linn's Stamp News; they are also available online from October 2010 to date in the Computers and Mathematics section.
