= Lester Dubins =

American mathematician

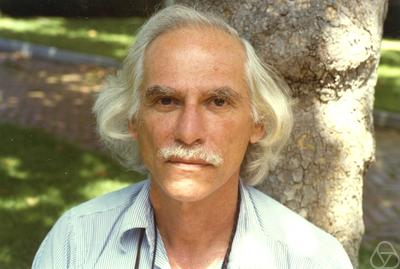
Lester Dubins

Lester Dubins (April 27, 1920 – February 11, 2010) was an American mathematician noted primarily for his research in probability theory. He was a faculty member at the University of California at Berkeley from 1962 through 2004, and in retirement was Professor Emeritus of Mathematics and Statistics.

It has been thought that, since classic red-and-black casino roulette is a game in which the house on average wins more than the gambler, that "bold play", i.e. betting one's whole purse on a single trial, is a uniquely optimal strategy. While a graduate student at the University of Chicago, Dubins surprised his teacher Leonard Jimmie Savage with a mathematical demonstration that this is not true. Dubins and Savage wrote a book that appeared in 1965 titled How to Gamble if You Must (Inequalities for Stochastic Processes) which presented a mathematical theory of gambling processes and optimal behavior in gambling situations, pointing out their relevance to traditional approaches to probability. Under the influence of the work of Bruno de Finetti, Dubins and Savage worked in the context of finitely additive rather than countably additive probability theory, thereby bypassing some technical difficulties.

Dubins was the author of nearly a hundred scholarly publications. Besides probability, some of these were on curves of minimal length under constraints on curvature and initial and final tangents (see Dubins path), Tarski's circle squaring problem, convex analysis, and geometry.

His doctoral students include Theodore Hill. Together with Gideon E. Schwarz he proved the Dubins–Schwarz theorem.

== Publications ==
- Dubins–Spanier theorems
- Dubins, L. E. (1957). "On Curves of Minimal Length with a Constraint on Average Curvature, and with Prescribed Initial and Terminal Positions and Tangents". American Journal of Mathematics. 79 (3): 497–516. doi:10.2307/2372560. JSTOR 2372560.
- Dubins, Lester E. (1957). "Conditional Probability Distributions in the Wide Sense". Proceedings of the American Mathematical Society. 8 (6): 1088–1092. doi:10.2307/2032685. JSTOR 2032685.
- Dubins, Lester E. (1960). "Another Proof of the Four Vertex Theorem". The American Mathematical Monthly. 67 (6): 573–574. doi:10.2307/2309181. JSTOR 2309181.
- Dubins, Lester E. (1960). "On Differentiation of Series Term-By-Term". The American Mathematical Monthly. 67 (8): 771–772. doi:10.2307/2308657. JSTOR 2308657.
- Dubins, Lester E.; Savage, Leonard J. (1960). "Optimal Gambling Systems". Proceedings of the National Academy of Sciences of the United States of America. 46 (12): 1597–1598. Bibcode:1960PNAS...46.1597D. doi:10.1073/pnas.46.12.1597. JSTOR 70777. PMC 223086. PMID 16590787.
- Dubins, Lester E.; Morgenthaler, George W. (1961). "Inclusion of Detection in Probability of Survival Models". Operations Research. 9 (6): 782–801. doi:10.1287/opre.9.6.782. JSTOR 167046.
- Blackwell, David; Dubins, Lester E. (1963). "Sharp Bounds on the Distribution of the Hardy-Littlewood Maximal Function". Proceedings of the American Mathematical Society. 14 (3): 450–453. doi:10.2307/2033819. JSTOR 2033819.
- Dubins, Lester E.; Freedman, David A. (1965). "A Sharper Form of the Borel-Cantelli Lemma and the Strong Law". The Annals of Mathematical Statistics. 36 (3): 800–807. doi:10.1214/aoms/1177700054. JSTOR 2238191.
- Dubins, Lester E.; Savage, Leonard J. (1965). "A Tchebycheff-Like Inequality for Stochastic Processes". Proceedings of the National Academy of Sciences of the United States of America. 53 (2): 274–275. Bibcode:1965PNAS...53..274D. doi:10.1073/pnas.53.2.274. JSTOR 72579. PMC 219506. PMID 16591259.
- Dubins, Lester E.; Schwarz, Gideon (1965). "On Continuous Martingales". Proceedings of the National Academy of Sciences of the United States of America. 53 (5): 913–916. Bibcode:1965PNAS...53..913D. doi:10.1073/pnas.53.5.913. JSTOR 72837. PMC 301348. PMID 16591279.
- Dubins, Lester E. (1966). "A Note on Upcrossings of Semimartingales". The Annals of Mathematical Statistics. 37 (3): 728. doi:10.1214/aoms/1177699469. JSTOR 2238744.
- Dubins, Lester E.; Freedman, David A. (1966). "Invariant Probabilities for Certain Markov Processes". The Annals of Mathematical Statistics. 37 (4): 837–848. doi:10.1214/aoms/1177699364. JSTOR 2238573.
- Dubins, Lester E.; Freedman, David A. (1966). "On the Expected Value of a Stopped Martingale". The Annals of Mathematical Statistics. 37 (6): 1505–1509. doi:10.1214/aoms/1177699142. JSTOR 2238767.
- Dubins, Lester E.; Teicher, Henry (1967). "Optimal Stopping When the Future is Discounted". The Annals of Mathematical Statistics. 38 (2): 601–605. doi:10.1214/aoms/1177698978. JSTOR 2239174.
- Dubins, Lester E. (1968). "A Simpler Proof of Smith's Roulette Theorem". The Annals of Mathematical Statistics. 39 (2): 390–393. doi:10.1214/aoms/1177698402. JSTOR 2239033.
- Dubins, Lester E. (1968). "On a Theorem of Skorohod". The Annals of Mathematical Statistics. 39 (6): 2094–2097. doi:10.1214/aoms/1177698036. JSTOR 2239305.
- Dubins, Lester E. (1972). "Sharp Bounds for the Total Variance of Uniformly Bounded Semimartingales". The Annals of Mathematical Statistics. 43 (5): 1559–1565. doi:10.1214/aoms/1177692388. JSTOR 2240078.
- Dubins, Lester E. (1973). "Which Functions of Stopping Times are Stopping Times?". The Annals of Probability. 1 (2): 313–316. doi:10.1214/aop/1176996983. JSTOR 2959492.
- Dubins, Lester E. (1974). "On Lebesgue-like Extensions of Finitely Additive Measures". The Annals of Probability. 2 (3): 456–463. doi:10.1214/aop/1176996660. JSTOR 2959178.
- Dubins, Lester E.; Meilijson, Isaac (1974). "On Stability for Optimization Problems". The Annals of Probability. 2 (2): 243–255. doi:10.1214/aop/1176996706. JSTOR 2959222.
- Blackwell, David; Dubins, Lester E. (1975). "On Existence and Non-Existence of Proper, Regular, Conditional Distributions". The Annals of Probability. 3 (5): 741–752. doi:10.1214/aop/1176996261. JSTOR 2959116.
- Dubins, Lester E. (1975). "Finitely Additive Conditional Probabilities, Conglomerability and Disintegrations". The Annals of Probability. 3 (1): 89–99. doi:10.1214/aop/1176996451. JSTOR 2959267.
- Dubins, Lester E.; Sudderth, William D. (1975). "An Example in which Stationary Strategies are not Adequate". The Annals of Probability. 3 (4): 722–725. doi:10.1214/aop/1176996312. JSTOR 2959335.
- Dubins, Lester E. (1977). "Group Decision Devices". The American Mathematical Monthly. 84 (5): 350–356. doi:10.2307/2319963. JSTOR 2319963.
- Dubins, Lester E. (1977). "Measurable, Tail Disintegrations of the Haar Integral are Purely Finitely Additive". Proceedings of the American Mathematical Society. 62 (1): 34–36. doi:10.2307/2041941. JSTOR 2041941.
- Dubins, Lester E. (1977). "On Everywhere-Defined Integrals". Transactions of the American Mathematical Society. 232: 187–194. doi:10.2307/1998933. JSTOR 1998933.
- Dubins, Lester E.; Sudderth, William D. (1977). "Persistently ϵ-Optimal Strategies". Mathematics of Operations Research. 2 (2): 125–134. doi:10.1287/moor.2.2.125. hdl:11299/199246. JSTOR 3689649.
- Dubins, Lester E.; Gilat, David (1978). "On the Distribution of Maxima of Martingale". Proceedings of the American Mathematical Society. 68 (3): 337–338. doi:10.2307/2043117. JSTOR 2043117.
- Dubins, Lester E.; Pitman, Jim (1979). "A Pointwise Ergodic Theorem for the Group of Rational Rotations". Transactions of the American Mathematical Society. 251: 299–308. doi:10.2307/1998695. JSTOR 1998695.
- Dubins, Lester E.; Sudderth, William D. (1979). "On Stationary Strategies for Absolutely Continuous Houses". The Annals of Probability. 7 (3): 461–476. doi:10.1214/aop/1176995047. JSTOR 2243199.
- Dubins, Lester E.; Pitman, Jim (1980). "A Divergent, Two-Parameter, Bounded Martingale". Proceedings of the American Mathematical Society. 78 (3): 414–416. doi:10.2307/2042335. JSTOR 2042335.
- Dubins, Lester E. (1982). "A Zero-One, Borel Probability which Admits of No Countably Additive Extensions". Proceedings of the American Mathematical Society. 86 (2): 273–274. doi:10.2307/2043394. JSTOR 2043394.
- Blackwell, David; Dubins, Lester E. (1983). "An Extension of Skorohod's Almost Sure Representation Theorem". Proceedings of the American Mathematical Society. 89 (4): 691–692. doi:10.2307/2044607. JSTOR 2044607.
- Dubins, Lester E. (1983). "A Gloss on a Theorem of Furstenberg". Proceedings of the American Mathematical Society. 89 (3): 421–422. doi:10.2307/2045487. JSTOR 2045487.
- Dubins, Lester E.; Heath, David (1983). "With Respect to Tail Sigma Fields, Standard Measures Possess Measurable Disintegrations". Proceedings of the American Mathematical Society. 88 (3): 416–418. doi:10.2307/2044985. JSTOR 2044985.
- Dubins, Lester E.; Heath, David (1984). "On Means with Countably Additive Continuities". Proceedings of the American Mathematical Society. 91 (2): 270–274. doi:10.2307/2044640. JSTOR 2044640.
- Dubins, Lester E. (1996). "The Gambler's Ruin Problem for Periodic Walks". Lecture Notes-Monograph Series. Institute of Mathematical Statistics Lecture Notes - Monograph Series. 30: 7–12. doi:10.1214/lnms/1215453561. ISBN 0-940600-42-0. JSTOR 4355934.
- Dubins, Lester E.; Gilat, David; Meilijson, Isaac (2009). "On the Expected Diameter of an L_{2}-Bounded Martingale". The Annals of Probability. 37 (1): 393–402. arXiv:0807.3571. doi:10.1214/08-aop406. JSTOR 30244283. S2CID 115157104.
- Dubins, Lester E.; Savage, Leonard J. (1965). How to gamble if you must: inequalities for stochastic processes. McGraw–Hill series in probability and statistics. McGraw–Hill.
