= Map segmentation =

In mathematics, the map segmentation problem is a kind of optimization problem. It involves a certain geographic region that has to be partitioned into smaller sub-regions in order to achieve a certain goal. Typical optimization objectives include:

- Minimizing the workload of a fleet of vehicles assigned to the sub-regions;
- Balancing the consumption of a resource, as in fair cake-cutting.
- Determining the optimal locations of supply depots;
- Maximizing the surveillance coverage.

Fair division of land has been an important issue since ancient times, e.g. in ancient Greece.

== Notation ==
There is a geographic region denoted by C ("cake").

A partition of C, denoted by X, is a list of disjoint subregions whose union is C:

$$C = X_1\sqcup\cdots\sqcup X_n$$

There is a certain set of additional parameters (such as: obstacles, fixed points or probability density functions), denoted by P.

There is a real-valued function denoted by G ("goal") on the set of all partitions.

The map segmentation problem is to find:

$$\arg\min_X G(X_1,\dots,X_n \mid P)$$

where the minimization is on the set of all partitions of C.

Often, there are geometric shape constraints on the partitions, e.g., it may be required that each part be a convex set or a connected set or at least a measurable set.

== Examples ==
1. Red-blue partitioning: there is a set $P_b$ of blue points and a set $P_r$ of red points. Divide the plane into $n$ regions such that each region contains approximately a fraction $1/n$ of the blue points and $1/n$ of the red points. Here:

- The cake C is the entire plane $\mathbb{R}^2$;
- The parameters P are the two sets of points;
- The goal function G is

$$G(X_1,\dots,X_n) := \max_{i\in \{1,\dots, n\}} \left( \left ||P_b\cap X_i| - \frac{|P_b|} n \right| + \left| |P_r\cap X_i| - \frac{ |P_r|} n\right| \right).$$

It equals 0 if each region has exactly a fraction $1/n$ of the points of each color.

== Related problems ==
- A Voronoi diagram is a specific type of map-segmentation problem.
- Fair cake-cutting, when the cake is two-dimensional, is another specific map-segmentation problem, like in the Hill–Beck land division problem.
- The Stone–Tukey theorem is related to a specific map-segmentation problem.
