= Hill–Beck land division problem =

Game Theory variant

The following variant of the fair cake-cutting problem was introduced by Ted Hill in 1983.

There is a territory D adjacent to n countries. Each country values the different subsets of D differently. The countries would like to divide D fairly among them, where "fair" means a proportional division. Additionally, the share allocated to each country must be connected and adjacent to that country. This geographic constraint distinguishes this problem from classic fair cake-cutting.

Formally, every country C_{i} must receive a disjoint piece of D, marked D_{i}, such that a portion of the border between C_{i} and D is contained in the interior of C_{i} ∪ D_{i}.

== Impossibility and possibility ==
There are cases in which the problem cannot be solved:

1. If there is a single point to which two countries assign all their value (e.g. a holy place), then obviously the territory cannot be divided proportionally. To prevent such situations, we assume that all countries assign a value of 0 to all singular points.
2. If D is a square, there are 4 countries adjacent to the 4 sides of the square, and each country assigns all its value to the border at the opposite side, then every allocation that connects, say, the northern country with its desired southern border will make it impossible to connect the eastern country with its desired western border (as long as we are in a two-dimensional plane). To prevent such situations, we assume that all countries assign a value of 0 to the boundary of D.

In 1983, Hill proved that, if each single point in D has a value of 0 for all countries, and the boundary of D has a value of 0 for all countries, then there exists a proportional division with the adjacency constraint. His proof was only existential – no algorithm was described.

== Algorithm ==
4 years later, Anatole Beck described a protocol for attaining such a division. In essence, the protocol is an elaboration of the Last diminisher protocol. It lets the countries bid for parts of D, gives the smallest bid to its bidder and divides the remainder among the remaining n − 1 countries. Some variations are needed to guarantee that the adjacency constraint is satisfied.

=== Simply-connected territory ===
When D is simply-connected, the following algorithm is used.

1. Find a Riemann mapping h that maps D to the unit disc, such that for all countries, the value of every circle centered at the origin is 0 and the value of every radius from the origin is 0 (the existence of such an h is proved by a counting argument).

2. Ask each country to draw, on the unit disc map h(D), a disc centered at the origin with a value of 1/n. This is possible thanks to the condition that the value of all circles centered at the origin is 0.

3. Find the disc D_{1} with the smallest radius, r_{1}.

There are two cases.

==== Single winner ====
4. If D_{1} was drawn by only a single country, say C_{i}, then give this disc to C_{i}. Its value for the other countries is strictly less than 1/n, so we can give to C_{i} a small additional piece connecting it to its allocated disc.

To do this, draw a sector connecting D_{1} to the image of the boundary between C_{i} and D. Let each country (other than C_{i}) trim this sector such that all countries value the union of the disc and the sector as at most 1/n. This is possible thanks to the condition that the value of all radii from the origin is 0. Allocate to C_{i} the union of D_{1} and the trimmed sector.

The remainder is simply-connected and has a value of at least (n − 1)/n to the remaining n − 1 countries, so the division can proceed recursively in step 1.

==== Many winners ====
If D_{1} was drawn by k>1 countries, then some more sophisticated auctions are required in order to find a country to which we can give a disc and a connecting sector.

5. pick an arbitrary winner country and call it the declarer, C_{1}. Let it add a sector connecting D_{1} to its current territory, and let the other countries trim that sector such that:

- For every non-winning country, the value of D_{1} plus the trimmed sector is at most 1/n (this is possible because the value of D_{1} for them is less than 1/n).
- For every winning country, the value of the trimmed sector alone is less than 1/n.

6. Let each of the winning countries bid a new radius r (smaller than its first bid), such that the value of the trimmed sector plus the disc of radius r is exactly 1/n. Select the smallest such disc, D_{2}. Again there are two cases:

If C_{1} is one of the countries bidding D_{2}, then just give it D_{2} (which is slightly smaller than the original D_{1}) and the connecting sector. C_{1} agreed that the value is 1/n and the other countries agreed that it is at most 1/n, so we can proceed recursively at step 1.

Otherwise, C_{1} agrees that the total value of D_{2} plus the connecting sector is less than 1/n. All non-winners must also agree to this since D_{2} is smaller than D_{1}. So C_{1} and all other countries that agree to this are removed from the set of winners.

7. From among the remaining winners, pick a new declarer C_{2}. Let it add another sector connecting D_{2} to its current territory, and let the other countries trim that sector as in step 5.

Note that now D_{2} is connected to two different territories – C_{1} and C_{2}. This is a problem because it makes the remaining territory disconnected. To solve this, C_{2} is allowed to take another sector, this time of length less than 1 so that it doesn't harm the connectivity. That third sector is again trimmed by all countries as in step 5. In return, C_{2} is required to give up some part of the sector connecting D_{2} to C_{1}, whose value is equal to the value of the third sector it received.

C_{2}'s candidate allocation now contains the following parts: D_{2}, a single sector of length 1 connecting D_{2} to C_{2}, and two short sectors that do not reach the border of D. The value of this construction for C_{2} is 1/n, its value for the non-winners is less than 1/n, and its value for the remaining winners is at most 1/n.

This process continues with the remaining winners, until only a single winner remains.

=== Finitely-connected territory ===
If the territory D is k-connected with a finite k, then the division can proceed by induction on k.

When k = 1, D is simply-connected and can be divided by the protocol of the previous section.

Otherwise (k > 1), mark the outer boundary of D by B_{1} and its inner boundaries by B_{2}, ..., B_{k}.

Find a line L connecting the outer boundary B_{1} to the inner boundary B_{k}, such that all countries value L as 0. This is possible by the following counting argument. There is an uncountable infinity of pairwise-disjoint lines connecting B_{1} and B_{k} and contained in D. But the measure of D is finite, so the number of lines with a positive measure must be finite.

The set D \ L is (k − 1)-connected. Divide it recursively, then assign L arbitrarily to any country adjacent to it. This does not affect the fairness of the allocation since the value of L is 0 for all countries.

== See also ==
- Fair cake-cutting
- Map segmentation
