= Variability hypothesis =

Hypothesis that human males have more variance in certain traits compared to females

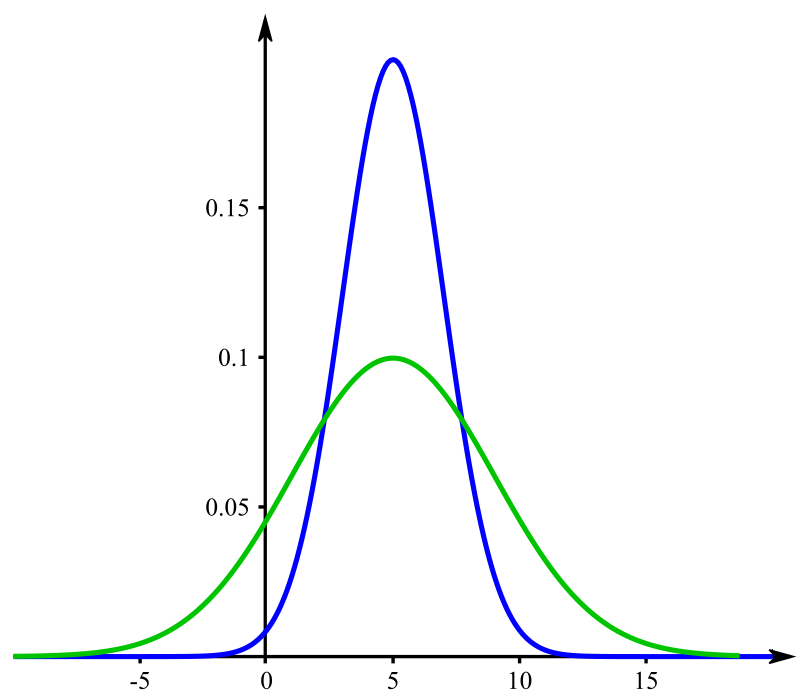
Two distribution curves with identical means but different variabilities. The curve with the greater variability (green) yields higher values in both the lowest and highest ends of the range.

The variability hypothesis, also known as the greater male variability hypothesis, is the hypothesis that human males generally display greater variability in traits than human females do.

It has often been discussed in relation to human cognitive ability, where some studies appear to show that males are more likely than females to have either very high or very low IQ test scores. In this context, there is controversy over whether such sex-based differences in the variability of intelligence exist, and if so, whether they are caused by genetic differences, environmental conditioning, or a combination of both.

== Early history ==
The notion of greater male variability-at least in respect to physical characteristics—can be traced back to the writings of Charles Darwin. When he expounded his theory of sexual selection in The Descent of Man and Selection in Relation to Sex, Darwin cites some observations made by his contemporaries. For example, he highlights findings from the Novara Expedition of 1861–1867 where "a vast number of measurements of various parts of the body in different races were made, and the men were found in almost every case to present a greater range of variation than the women" (p. 275). To Darwin, the evidence from the medical community at the time, which suggested a greater prevalence of physical abnormalities among men than women, was also indicative of men's greater physical variability.

Although Darwin was curious about sex differences in variability throughout the animal kingdom, variability in humans was not a chief concern of his research. The first scholar to carry out a detailed empirical investigation on the question of human sex differences in variability in both physical and mental faculties, was the sexologist and eugenecist Havelock Ellis. In his 1894 publication Man and Woman: A Study of Human Secondary Sexual Characters, Ellis dedicated an entire chapter to the subject, entitled "The Variational Tendency of Men". In this chapter he posits that "both the physical and mental characters of men show wider limits of variation than do the physical and mental characters of women" (p. 358). Ellis documents several studies that support this assertion (see pp. 360–367), and

"By the 1890s several studies had been conducted to demonstrate that variability was indeed more characteristic of males...The biological evidence overwhelmingly favored males as the more variable sex."

=== Early controversies in the 20th century ===
The publication of Ellis's Man and Woman led to an intellectual dispute about the variability hypothesis between Ellis and the statistician Karl Pearson, whose critique of Ellis's work was both theoretical and methodological. After Pearson dismissed Ellis's conclusions, he then "presented his own data to show that it was the female who was more variable than the male" Ellis wrote a letter to Pearson thanking him for the criticisms which would allow him to present his arguments "more clearly & precisely than before", but did not yield his position regarding greater male variability.

Support for the greater male variability hypothesis grew during the early part of the 20th century. During this period, the attention of researchers shifted towards studying variability in mental abilities partly due to the advent of standardised mental tests (see the history of the Intelligence quotient), which made it possible to examine intelligence with greater objectivity and precision.

One advocate of greater male variability during this time was the American psychologist Edward Thorndike, one of the leading exponents of mental testing who played an instrumental role in the development of today's Armed Services Vocational Aptitude Battery ASVAB. In his 1906 publication Sex in Education, Thorndike argued that while mean level sex differences in intellectual ability appeared to be negligible, sex differences in variability were clear. Other influential proponents of the hypothesis at this time were psychologists G. Stanley Hall and James McKeen Cattell. Thorndike believed that variability in intelligence could have a biological basis and suggested that this could have important implications for achievement and pedagogy. For example, he postulated that greater male variation could mean "eminence and leadership of the world's affairs of whatever sort will inevitably belong oftener to men." In addition, since the number of women that fall within the extreme top-end of the intelligence distribution would be inherently smaller, he suggested that educational resources should be invested in preparing women for roles and occupations that require only a mediocre level of cognitive ability.

=== Leta Hollingworth's studies ===
By examining the case records of 1,000 patients at the Clearing House for Mental Defectives, Leta Hollingworth determined that, although men outnumbered women in the clearing house, the ratio of men to women decreased with age. Hollingworth explained this to be the result of men facing greater societal expectations than women. Consequently, deficiencies in men were often detected at an earlier age, while similar deficiencies in women might not be detected because less was expected of them. Therefore, deficiencies in women would be required to be more pronounced than those in men in order to be detected at similar ages.

Hollingworth also attacked the variability hypothesis theoretically, criticizing the underlying logic of the hypothesis. Hollingworth argued that the variability hypothesis was flawed because: (1) it had not been empirically established that men were more anatomically variable than women, (2) even if greater anatomical variability in men were established this would not necessarily mean that men were also more variable in mental traits, (3) even if it were established that men were more variable in mental traits this would not automatically mean that men were innately more variable, (4) variability is not significant in and of itself, but rather depends on what the variability consists of, and (5) that any possible differences in variability between men and women must also be understood with reference to the fact that women lack the opportunity to achieve eminence because of their prescribed societal and cultural roles at the time. Additionally, the argument that great variability automatically meant greater range was criticized by Hollingworth.

In an attempt to examine the validity of the variability hypothesis, while avoiding intervening social and cultural factors, Hollingworth gathered data on birth weight and length of 1,000 male and 1,000 female newborns. This research found virtually no difference in the variability of male and female infants birth weight, and it was concluded that if variability favored any sex, it was the female sex. The general consensus today is that boys have a higher birth weight than girls, and are more responsive to their mother's diet while in the womb, thus causing an even greater variation if nutritional needs are met.

== Modern studies ==
The 21st century has witnessed a resurgence of research on gender differences in variability, with most of the emphasis on humans. The results vary based on the type of problem, but some recent studies have found that the variability hypothesis is true for parts of IQ tests, with more men falling at the extremes of the distribution. Publications differ as to the extent and distribution of male variability, including on whether variability can be shown across various cultural and social factors.

=== 2004 twin chromosome study ===
A 2004 study attempted to test for the effects of the averaging of the x-chromosomes through a sample of about 1000 female twins and 1000 male twins at each age from 2 to 4. They hypothesized that MZF (monozygotic female) twins due to x inactivation would have lower correlations with their co-twin than males and the opposite would be true for DZF (dizygotic female) twins due to females sharing an x chromosome from their father. They found statistically significant results for:

- Prosocial behavior at age 2 for MZF (lower) and at age 3 for DZF twins (higher)
- Peer problems for MZF twins (data only available for age 4)
- Verbal ability at age 3 for MZF (lower) and DZF (higher) twins
- Anxiety at age 4 for MZF (higher). The inconsistent result with the hypothesis likely means there are no X-linked loci for anxiety.

No statistically significant results were found for MZ or DZ twins for: Hyperactivity, conduct problems, total behavioural problems, nonverbal ability, or g.

=== 2007 metanalysis ===
A 2007 meta-analysis found that males are more variable on most measures of quantitative and visuospatial ability, making no conclusions of its causation.

=== 2008 analyses ===
A 2008 analysis of test scores across 41 countries published in Science concluded that "data shows a higher variance in boys' than girls' results on mathematics and reading tests in most OECD countries", the results implying that "gender differences in the variance of test scores are an international phenomenon". However, it also found that several countries failed to exhibit a gender difference in variance.

A follow up study of C.S loat et al. 2004 replicated some of their previous findings.

==== 2-4 year olds: ====
- SDQ Prosociality MZF (lower) DZF (higher)
- SDQ Hyperactivity MZF (lower)
- SDQ problem behaviour MZF (lower)

==== 8 year olds: ====
- CAST composite DZF (higher)
- CAST social MZF (lower)
- CAST communication DZF (higher)
- CAST non-social DZF (higher)

No statistically significant results were found for the cognitive or academic measures. 7 year olds: SDQ conduct, SDQ peer problems, SDQ anxiety. 8 year olds: conners ADHD, RPQ composite.

The study was done on about 1000 twins for each sex and zygosity like the previous study, but the sample was 7–8 years old this time and only different behavioral measures were taken by the 8 year olds unlike the 7 year olds who took cognitive tests too.

=== 2008 review ===
A 2008 study reviewed the history of the hypothesis that general intelligence is more biologically variable in males than in females and presented data which the authors claim "in many ways are the most complete that have ever been compiled [and which] substantially support the hypothesis".

=== 2009 non-cognitive traits study ===
A 2009 study in developmental psychology examined non-cognitive traits including blood parameters and birth weight as well as certain cognitive traits, and concluded that "greater intrasex phenotype variability in males than in females is a fundamental aspect of the gender differences in humans".

=== 2010 metanalysis of math scores ===
Recent studies indicate that greater male variability in mathematics persists in the U.S., although the ratio of boys to girls at the top end of the distribution is reversed in Asian Americans. A 2010 meta-analysis of 242 studies found that males have an 8% greater variance in mathematical abilities than females, which the authors indicate is not meaningfully different from an equal variance. Additionally, they find several datasets indicate no or a reversed variance ratio.

=== 2010 twin study ===
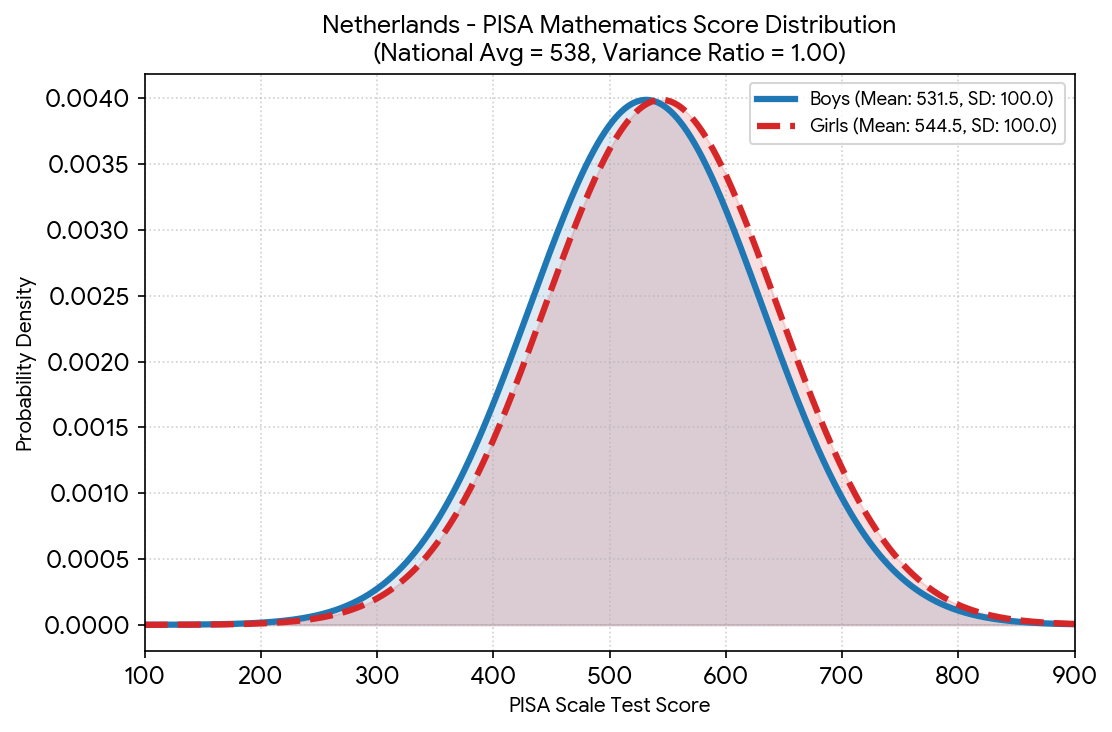
Though female students scored slightly higher on average, the graph depicts identical standard deviations, and therefore identical variability, between male and female students. The authors of the 2012 study "Debunking Myths about Gender and Mathematics Performance" used this as evidence while refuting the greater male variability hypothesis.

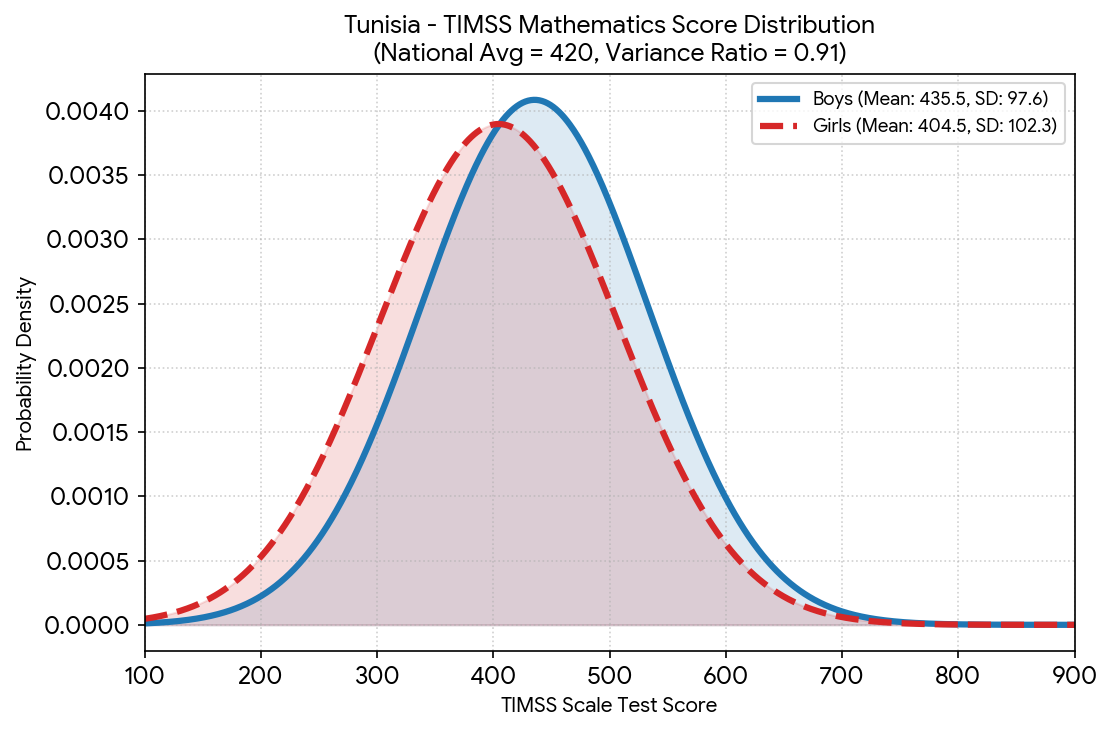
While the male students scored higher on average, this graph shows that female students were more variable than male students, which the authors of the 2012 study "Debunking Myths about Gender and Mathematics Performance" used to refute the greater male variability hypothesis.

A 2010 study with a similar methodology to C.S loat et al. 2004 with 272 twin pairs taking an IQ test and 324 twin pairs were assessed using measure of child behavioural problems and found no evidence of an X-linked contribution to greater variance in males and no statistically significant interaction of sex and chorion type.

=== 2012 study on variance in math performance ===
A 2012 study compared male and female variability on math scores using data from the Trends in International Mathematics and Science Study (TIMSS) and the Programme for International Student Assessment (PISA) in order to draw conclusions about the greater male variability hypothesis. It found that sex differences in mathematics performance variability varied drastically by country. In some countries (such as Tunisia, Indonesia, and Armenia), female students actually demonstrated greater variability than their male peers in terms of mathematics performance, while other nations (such as the Netherlands, the Czech Republic and Morocco) saw no difference in variability between sexes, and the remainder of countries (including Hong Kong, Spain, and the United States) showed greater male variability. As a result, the authors concluded that sex differences in variability are not driven by innate biological mechanics, but rather socioeconomic and cultural factors.

=== 2012 genetic study ===
A 2012 study tested for evidence of X-linked basis of greater variance of males in cognitive abilities. The authors had two hypotheses:

1. The within-pair variance should be greater in DZ (dizygotic) twins than MZ twins if the x-chromosome causes greater variation in the cognitive test scores of males (although, obviously x chromosome differences aren't the only genetic sources of within pair variation.)
2. Greater differences in within-pair variation between MZ and DZ twins for male relative to female MZ and DZ.

The evidence supported hypothesis one for both males and females but not hypothesis two. Thus the authors found no evidence of an averaging effect on the x-chromosomes for females results in greater variance for males in cognitive abilities, but they do not accept this as conclusive evidence.

=== 2013 genetic study ===
Looking for genetic evidence of variability between the sexes, a 2013 study used the body sizes of different species that either had heterogametic males (mammals and insects) or heterogametic females (birds and butterflies). The study found that heterogametic males had higher variability in body size than homogametic females, while heterogametic females had higher variability in body size than homogametic males, thus showing a relation between the chromosomes and variability between the sexes in traits.

=== 2014 review of math and emotion variance ===
A 2014 review found that males tend to have higher variance on mathematical and verbal abilities but females tend to have higher variance on fear and emotionality; however, the differences in variance are small and without much practical significance and the causes remain unknown. A 2005 meta-analysis found greater female variability on the standard Raven's Progressive Matrices, and no difference in variability on the advanced progressive matrices, but also found that males had a higher average general intelligence. This meta analysis, however, was criticized for bias by the authors and for poor methodology.

=== 2015 meta-analysis of micro array datasets ===
The sex difference in variability in gene expression, using CV, was similar and the difference was in either direction depending on the tissue and they state that they found little evidence that X-linked gene expression was more variable in human males compared to human females.

=== 2016 contested analysis ===
A 2016 study by Baye and Monseur examining twelve databases from the International Association for the Evaluation of Educational Achievement and the Program for International Student Assessment were used to analyze gender differences within an international perspective from 1995 to 2015, and concluded, "The 'greater male variability hypothesis' is confirmed." This study found that on average, boys showed 14% greater variance than girls in science, reading, and math test scores. In reading, boys were significantly represented at the bottom of score distribution, whereas for maths and science they featured more at the top.

The results of Baye and Monseur have been both replicated and criticized in a 2019 meta-analytical extension published by Helen Gray and her associates, which broadly confirmed that variability is greater for males internationally but that there is significant heterogeneity between countries. They also found that policies leading to greater female participation in the workforce tended to increase female variability and, therefore, decrease the variability gap. They also point out that Baye and Monseur had themselves observed a lack of international consistency, leading more support to a cultural hypothesis.

=== 2018 metanalysis of school children ===
A 2018 meta analysis of over 1 million school-aged children found strong evidence for higher variability in boys' grades, but for girls to receive higher grades on average, both of which the authors describe as "in line with previous studies". Due in part to the combination of these factors, they conclude that differences in variability are insufficient to explain disparities in STEM college admissions. They note: "Simulations of these differences suggest the top 10% of a class contains equal numbers of girls and boys in STEM, but more girls in non-STEM subjects."

=== 2018 GWAS study ===
Their X-chromosome GWAS results found similar SNP heritability estimates for both sexes, thus stating any contribution of common variants in the X-chromosome would be "quantitively negligible" to normal-range variance of cognitive phenotypes.The estimates for X-chromosome SNP heritability for females were negligibly higher.

=== 2020 brain morphometry study ===
In October 2020, with respect to brain morphometry, researchers reported "the largest-ever mega-analysis of sex differences in variability of brain structure"; they stated that they "observed significant patterns of greater male than female between-subject variance for all subcortical volumetric measures, all cortical surface area measures, and 60% of cortical thickness measures. This pattern was stable across the lifespan for 50% of the subcortical structures, 70% of the regional area measures, and nearly all regions for thickness." The authors emphasize, however, that this has of yet no practical interpretive meaning, says nothing on causation, and requires further examination and replication.

=== 2021 metanalyses in experimental economics ===
In 2021, two meta-analyses on preference measurement in experimental economics find strong evidence for greater male variability for cooperation (variance ratio: 1.30, 95% CI [1.22, 1.38]), time preferences (1.15, [1.08, 1.22]), risk preferences (1.25 [1.13, 1.37]), dictator game offers (1.18 [1.12, 1.25]) and transfers in the trust game (1.28 [1.18, 1.39]).

=== 2021 AP student study ===
A 2021 study of 10 million AP calculus and statistics students from 1997 to 2019, found that although female participation in these courses has increased significantly, the proportion of males to females at the top scores in the AP math exams is still substantial, though the proportion of males to females at the top scores has been slowly decreasing.

=== 2021 review of sexual dimorphism in STEM ===
A 2021 review investigating different hypotheses behind the discrepancy of sexes in STEM jobs summarizes the greater variability research with respect to this question. Given that research finds greater variability in males within quantitative and nonverbal reasoning, they hold that this can explain some, but not all of the difference seen in STEM occupations. With regard to the question of whether these results are due to societal influences or of biological origins, they hold that the results showing greater variance at a very young age (for instance IQ differences in variability between the sexes is visible from a young age on) lend credence to the theory that biological factors might explain a large part of the observed data.

=== 2022 energy expenditure analysis ===
A 2022 analysis of a large database on energy expenditure in adult humans found that "even when statistically comparing males and females of the same age, height, and body composition, there is much more variation in total, activity, and basal energy expenditure among males". A later paper reaffirmed this finding showing that there is greater male variability in daily energy intake.2023

=== 2023 Analysis of Errors in Male Variability Studies ===
A 2023 paper examined common "basic statistical, inferential, and logical errors" in studies that resulted in data that supported greater male variability, such as applying greater male variability on the global scale to individual countries and cultures and treating any difference in variability between males and females as statistically significant. The authors suggested that studies that took these factors into account were needed for a more accurate conclusion to be drawn.

=== NHANES analysis ===
A paper published in 2023 analyzed 50 morphological and physiological traits from the NHANES database and found that nearly half the traits did not exhibit sexual dimorphism in variation, while 18 exhibited greater female variation (GFV), indicating GFV does not dominate human characteristics. Only eight traits exhibited greater male variation, indicating GMV also does not dominate. The results also seemed to suggest that the menstrual cycle typically doesn't seem to explain GFV when it occurs, nor did it seem that sexual selection explained GMV. The traits associated with muscle (total lean mass, leg lean mass, and serum creatinine which positively associates with muscle mass) do not indicate GMV. Instead, the first two traits exhibit GFV, while serum creatinine does not exhibit sexual dimorphism in variation in either direction.

=== 2024 bodymass analysis ===
A 2024 study analyzed a large dataset of 337 species and found that the larger sex, most of the time, displayed more variation in body mass, however some orders deviated somewhat from the expected relationship, suggesting additional factors affecting one sex over the other. The authors propose that other biological processes and factors such as rigorous male-male competition which can be deleterious to their health and greater range related to mate search in monogamous primates (where the sexes are about equal in size usually) which could increase energy expenditure and exposure to parasites.

== Contemporary controversies ==
In a 1992 paper titled "Variability: A Pernicious Hypothesis", Stanford Professor Nel Noddings discussed the social history which she argued explains "the revulsion with which many feminists react to the variability hypothesis."

In 2005, then Harvard President, Larry Summers, addressed the National Bureau of Economic Research Conference on the subject of gender diversity in the science and engineering professions, saying: "It does appear that on many, many different human attributes—height, weight, propensity for criminality, overall IQ, mathematical ability, scientific ability—there is relatively clear evidence that whatever the difference in means—which can be debated—there is a difference in the standard deviation, and variability of a male and a female population." His remarks caused a backlash; Summers faced a no-confidence vote from the Harvard faculty, prompting his resignation as President.

In 2017, a mathematics research paper by Theodore P. Hill and Sergei Tabachnikov, presenting a possible evolutionary explanation for the variability hypothesis, was peer-reviewed, accepted, and formally published in The New York Journal of Mathematics. Three days later, that article was removed and replaced by an unrelated article by different authors. This caused debate within the scientific community and international publicity. A revised version was subsequently peer-reviewed again and published in the Journal of Interdisciplinary Mathematics.

However, recent genetic empirical studies have found no evidence supporting the proposition that the 'averaging' effect of X-inactivation in females results in greater variability in male cognitive ability, https://pubmed.ncbi.nlm.nih.gov/22843342/

== See also ==
- Sex differences in humans
- Sex and psychology
- Bateman's principle
- Lek paradox
- Sexual dimorphism
- Dual-mating strategy
