= Lek paradox =

Conundrum in sexual selection behaviour

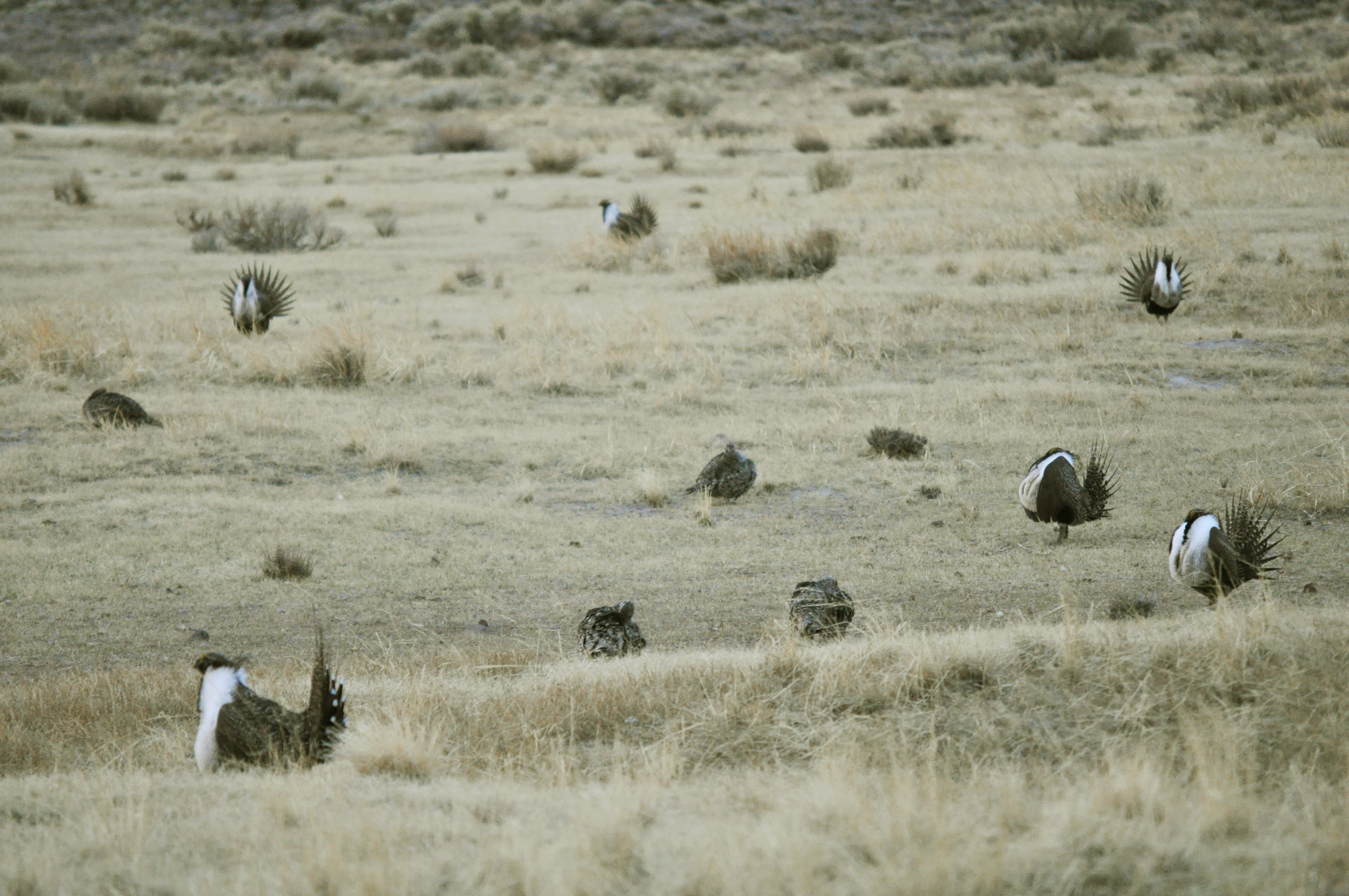
Greater sage-grouse at lek, with multiple males displaying for the less conspicuous females

The lek paradox is a conundrum in evolutionary biology that addresses the persistence of genetic variation in male traits within lek mating systems, despite strong sexual selection through female choice. This paradox arises from the expectation that consistent female preference for particular male traits should erode genetic diversity, theoretically leading to a loss of the benefits of choice. The lek paradox challenges our understanding of how genetic variation is maintained in populations subject to intense sexual selection, particularly in species where males provide only genes to their offspring. Several hypotheses have been proposed to resolve this paradox, including the handicap principle, condition-dependent trait expression, and parasite resistance models.

== Background ==
A lek is a type of mating system characterized by the aggregation of male animals for the purpose of competitive courtship displays. This behavior, known as lekking, is a strategy employed by various species to attract females for mating. Leks are most commonly observed in birds, but also occur in other vertebrates such as some bony fish, amphibians, reptiles, and mammals, as well as certain arthropods including crustaceans and insects. In a typical lek, males gather in a specific area to perform elaborate displays, while females visit to select a mate. This system is notable for its strong female choice in mate selection and the absence of male parental care. Leks can be classified as classical (where male territories are in close proximity) or exploded (with more widely separated territories).

== The paradox ==
The lek paradox is the conundrum of how additive or beneficial genetic variation is maintained in lek mating species in the face of consistent sexual selection based on female preferences. While many studies have attempted to explain how the lek paradox fits into Darwinian theory, the paradox remains. Persistent female choice for particular male trait values should erode genetic diversity in male traits and thereby remove the benefits of choice, yet choice persists. This paradox can be somewhat alleviated by the occurrence of mutations introducing potential differences, as well as the possibility that traits of interest have more or less favorable recessive alleles.

== Causes and conditions ==
The basis of the lek paradox is continuous genetic variation in spite of strong female preference for certain traits. There are two conditions in which the lek paradox arises. The first is that males contribute only genes and the second is that female preference does not affect fecundity. Female choice should lead to directional runaway selection, resulting in a greater prevalence for the selected traits. Stronger selection should lead to impaired survival, as it decreases genetic variance and ensures that more offspring have similar traits. However, lekking species do not exhibit runaway selection.

== Male characteristics and female benefits ==
In a lekking reproductive system, what male sexual characteristics can signal to females is limited, as the males provide no resources to females or parental care to their offspring. This implies that a female gains indirect benefits from her choice in the form of "good genes" for her offspring. Hypothetically, in choosing a male that excels at courtship displays, females gain genes for their offspring that increase their survival or reproductive fitness.

== Handicap principle ==
Amotz Zahavi declared that male sexual characteristics only convey useful information to the females if these traits confer a handicap on the male. Otherwise, males could simply cheat: if the courtship displays have a neutral effect on survival, males could all perform equally and it would signify nothing to the females. But if the courtship display is somehow deleterious to the male's survival—such as increased predator risk or time and energy expenditure—it becomes a test by which females can assess male quality. Under the handicap principle, males who excel at the courtship displays prove that they are of better quality and genotype, as they have already withstood the costs to having these traits. Resolutions have been formed to explain why strong female mate choice does not lead to runaway selection. The handicap principle describes how costly male ornaments provide females with information about the male's inheritable fitness. The handicap principle may be a resolution to the lek paradox, for if females select for the condition of male ornaments, then their offspring have better fitness.

== Genic capture hypothesis ==
One potential resolution to the lek paradox is Rowe and Houle's theory of condition-dependent expression of male sexually selected traits. Similar to the handicap principle, Rowe and Houle argue that sexually selected traits depend on physical condition. Condition, in turn, summarizes a large number of genetic loci, including those involved in metabolism, muscular mass, nutrition, etc. Rowe and Houle claim that condition dependence maintains genetic variation in the face of persistent female choice, as the male trait is correlated with abundant genetic variation in condition. This is the genic capture hypothesis, which describes how a significant amount of the genome is involved in shaping the traits that are sexually selected. There are two criteria in the genic capture hypothesis: the first is that sexually selected traits are dependent upon condition and the second is that general condition is attributable to high genetic variance.

== Genetic variation and environmental effects ==
Genetic variation in condition-dependent traits may be further maintained through mutations and environmental effects. Genotypes may be more effective in developing condition dependent sexual characteristics in different environments, while mutations may be deleterious in one environment and advantageous in another. Thus genetic variance remains in populations through gene flow across environments or generation overlap. According to the genic capture hypothesis, female selection does not deplete the genetic variance, as sexual selection operates on condition dependence traits, thereby accumulating genetic variance within the selected for trait. Therefore, females are actually selecting for high genetic variance.

== Parasite resistance hypothesis ==
In an alternate but non-exclusionary hypothesis, W. D. Hamilton and M. Zuk proposed that successful development of sexually selected traits signal resistance to parasites. Parasites can significantly stress their hosts so that they are unable to develop sexually selected traits as well as healthy males. According to this theory, a male who vigorously displays demonstrates that he has parasite-resistant genes to the females. In support of this theory, Hamilton and Zuk found that male sexual ornaments were significantly correlated with levels of incidence of six blood diseases in North American passerine bird species. The Hamilton and Zuk model addresses the lek paradox, arguing that the cycles of co-adaptation between host and parasite resist a stable equilibrium point. Hosts continue to evolve resistance to parasites and parasites continue to bypass resistant mechanisms, continuously generating genetic variation. The genic capture and parasite resistance hypotheses could logically co-occur in the same population.

One resolution to the lek paradox involves female preferences and how preference alone does not cause a drastic enough directional selection to diminish the genetic variance in fitness. Another conclusion is that the preferred trait is not naturally selected for or against and the trait is maintained because it implies increased attractiveness to the male. Thus, there may be no paradox.
