= Genic capture =

Genic capture is a hypothesis explaining the maintenance of genetic variance in traits under sexual selection. A classic problem in sexual selection is the fixation of alleles that are beneficial under strong selection, thereby eliminating the benefits of mate choice. Genic capture resolves this paradox by suggesting that additive genetic variance of sexually selected traits reflects the genetic variance in total condition. A deleterious mutation anywhere in the genome will adversely affect condition, and thereby adversely affect a condition-dependent sexually selected trait. Genic capture therefore resolves the lek paradox by proposing that recurrent deleterious mutation maintains additive genetic variance in fitness by incorporating the entire mutation load of an individual. Thus any condition-dependent trait "captures" the overall genetic variance in condition. Rowe and Houle argued that genic capture ensures that good genes will become a central feature of the evolution of any sexually selected trait.

== Condition ==
The key quantity for genic capture is vaguely defined as "condition." The hypothesis only defines condition as a quantity that correlates tightly with overall fitness, such that directional selection will always increase average condition over time. Condition should, in general, reflect overall energy acquisition, such that life-history variation reflects differential allocation to survival and sexual signalling. Genetic variation in condition should be very broadly affected by any changes in the genome. Close to equilibrium any mutation should be deleterious, thereby leading to non-zero overall mutation rate, maintaining variance in fitness.

== Rowe and Houle's quantitative genetic model ==
Rowe and Houle's simple model defines a trait as the result of three heritable components, a condition-independent component $a$, epistatic modification $b$ and condition, suggesting the following function for a trait:

$T = a + bC$

where $C$ is the condition of an individual. Loci contributing to $C$ are loosely linked and independent of loci contributing to $a$ and $b$. Rowe and Houle then find the expected variance of $T$ and ignored higher-order terms (i.e. products of variances):

$G_T \approx G_a + \bar{b}^2 G_C + \bar{C}^2 G_b$

where $G_T$ represents the genetic variance in the signal and analogously for other traits. Under directional selection on $T$, the loci underlying $a$ and $b$ may lose all genetic variance. However, there is no qualitative difference in directional selection on $C$ between stabilizing selection (i.e. no sexual selection) and directional selection on $T$. Therefore, the second term $\bar{b}^2 G_C$ will remain positive (due to biased mutation) and dominate $G_T$ under sexual selection.

== Other applications ==
Genic capture can also play a role in accelerating adaptation to new environments.

== Comparisons ==
Genic capture was proposed as a simpler alternative to another theory explaining the lek paradox that proposed that sexual selection creates disruptive selection, i.e. positive selection for genetic variance. Genic capture does not require any particular fitness function.
