= Harrow County Grammar School =

Harrow County Grammar School may refer to one of two schools closed in 1975:

- Harrow County School for Boys, a grammar school now an academy called Harrow High School
- Harrow County School for Girls, a grammar school no longer in existence
