= Ted Hill (mathematician) =

American mathematician (born 1943)

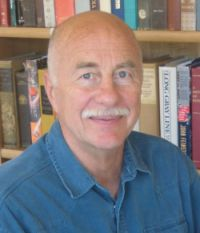
- Born: Theodore Preston Hill; December 28, 1943 (age 82); Flatbush, New York, U.S.
- Education: U.S. Military Academy; Stanford University; UC Berkeley
- Known for: Probability theory: Benford's Law, Fair division, Optimal Stopping
- Scientific career
- Fields: Mathematics
- Workplaces: Georgia Tech; Washington University; Tel Aviv University; University of Costa Rica
- Doctoral advisor: Lester Dubins

Theodore Preston Hill (born December 28, 1943), professor emeritus at Georgia Tech, is an American mathematician specializing mainly in probability theory. He is an Elected Member of the International Statistical Institute (1993), and an Elected Fellow of the Institute of Mathematical Statistics (1999).

== Contributions ==
Hill discovered what many consider to be the definitive proof of Benford's law. He is also known for his research in the theories of optimal stopping (including the secretary problem and prophet inequality) and of fair division, in particular the Hill–Beck land division problem.

Hill has attracted widespread attention for a paper on the variability hypothesis, the theory that men exhibit greater variability than women in genetically controlled traits that he wrote with Sergei Tabachnikov. A later version authored by Hill alone was peer reviewed and accepted by The New York Journal of Mathematics and retracted after publication. A revised version, again authored by Hill alone, was subsequently peer reviewed again and published in the Journal of Interdisciplinary Mathematics.

== Education and career ==
Born in Flatbush, New York, he studied at the United States Military Academy, and Stanford University (M.S. in Operations Research). After graduating from the U.S. Army Ranger School and serving as an Army Captain in the Combat Engineers of the 25th Infantry Division in Vietnam, he returned to study mathematics at the University of Göttingen (Fulbright Scholar), the UC Berkeley College of Letters and Science (M.A., Ph.D. under advisor Lester Dubins), and as NATO/NSF Postdoctoral Fellow at Leiden University.

He spent most of his career as a professor in the Georgia Institute of Technology College of Sciences, with temporary appointments at Arts and Sciences at Washington University in St. Louis, Tel Aviv University, the University of Hawaiʻi at Mānoa, the University of Göttingen (Fulbright Professor), the University of Costa Rica, the Vrije Universiteit Amsterdam, the Mexican Centre for Mathematical Research (CIMAT), and as Gauss Professor in the Göttingen Academy of Sciences and Humanities.

== Selected publications ==
- Theodore P. Hill (1995). "A Statistical Derivation of the Significant-Digit Law" (PDF). Statistical Science. 10 (4): 354–363. doi:10.1214/ss/1177009869. MR 1421567.
- Theodore P. Hill (July–August 1998). "The First Digit Phenomenon" (PDF). American Scientist. 86 (4): 358+. Bibcode:1998AmSci..86..358H. doi:10.1511/1998.4.358. S2CID 13553246.
- Theodore P. Hill (July–August 2000). "Mathematical Devices for Getting a Fair Share" (PDF). American Scientist. 88 (4): 325+. Bibcode:2000AmSci..88..325H. doi:10.1511/2000.4.325. S2CID 221539202.
- Theodore P. Hill (March–April 2009). "Knowing When to Stop". American Scientist. 97 (2): 126+. doi:10.1511/2009.77.126. S2CID 124798270.
- Arno Berger & Theodore P. Hill (2015). An Introduction to Benford's Law. Princeton University Press. ISBN 978-0-691-16306-2.
- Theodore P. Hill (2017). Pushing Limits: From West Point to Berkeley and Beyond. American Mathematical Society and Mathematical Association of America. ISBN 978-1-4704-3584-4.
- Theodore P. Hill (2018). "Slicing Sandwiches, States, and Solar Systems". American Scientist. 106 (1): 42–49. doi:10.1511/2018.106.1.42.
- Theodore P. Hill & Kent E. Morrison (2023). "The Math of Beach Pebble Formation". American Scientist. 111 (3): 168–175. doi:10.1511/2023.111.3.168.
