= Needle-nose pliers =

Pliers with a narrow, pointed tip

Needle-nose pliers, also known as long-nose pliers and snipe-nose pliers, are both cutting and holding pliers used by artisans, jewellery designers, electricians, network engineers and other tradesmen to bend, re-position and snip wire. Their namesake long nose gives excellent control while the cutting edge near the pliers' joint provides "one-tool" convenience. Because of their long shape they are useful for reaching into small areas where cables or other materials have become stuck or unreachable with fingers or other means.

Bent nose pliers, also named bent needle-nose pliers, curved nose pliers or curved needle-nose pliers, have a curved beak.

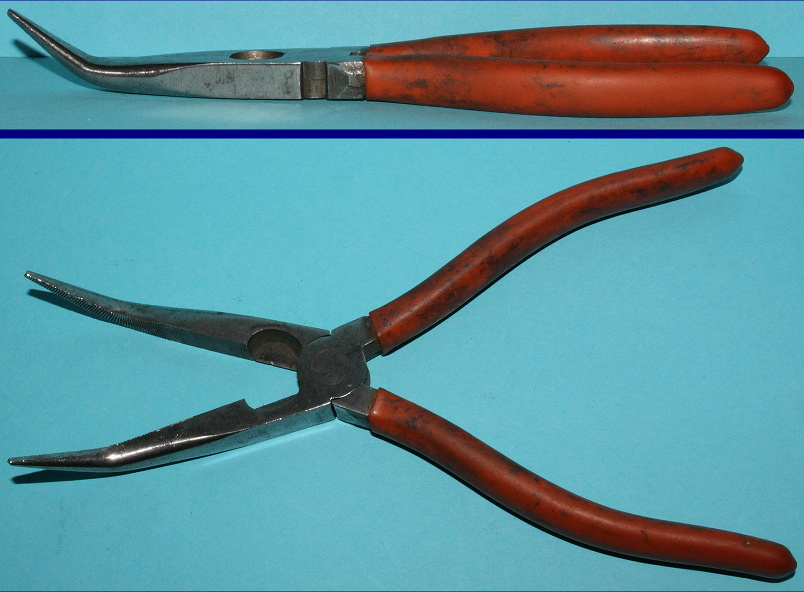
Bent needle-nose pliers

Wiring pliers, are used to cut, strip and manipulate wire during the process of terminating it.

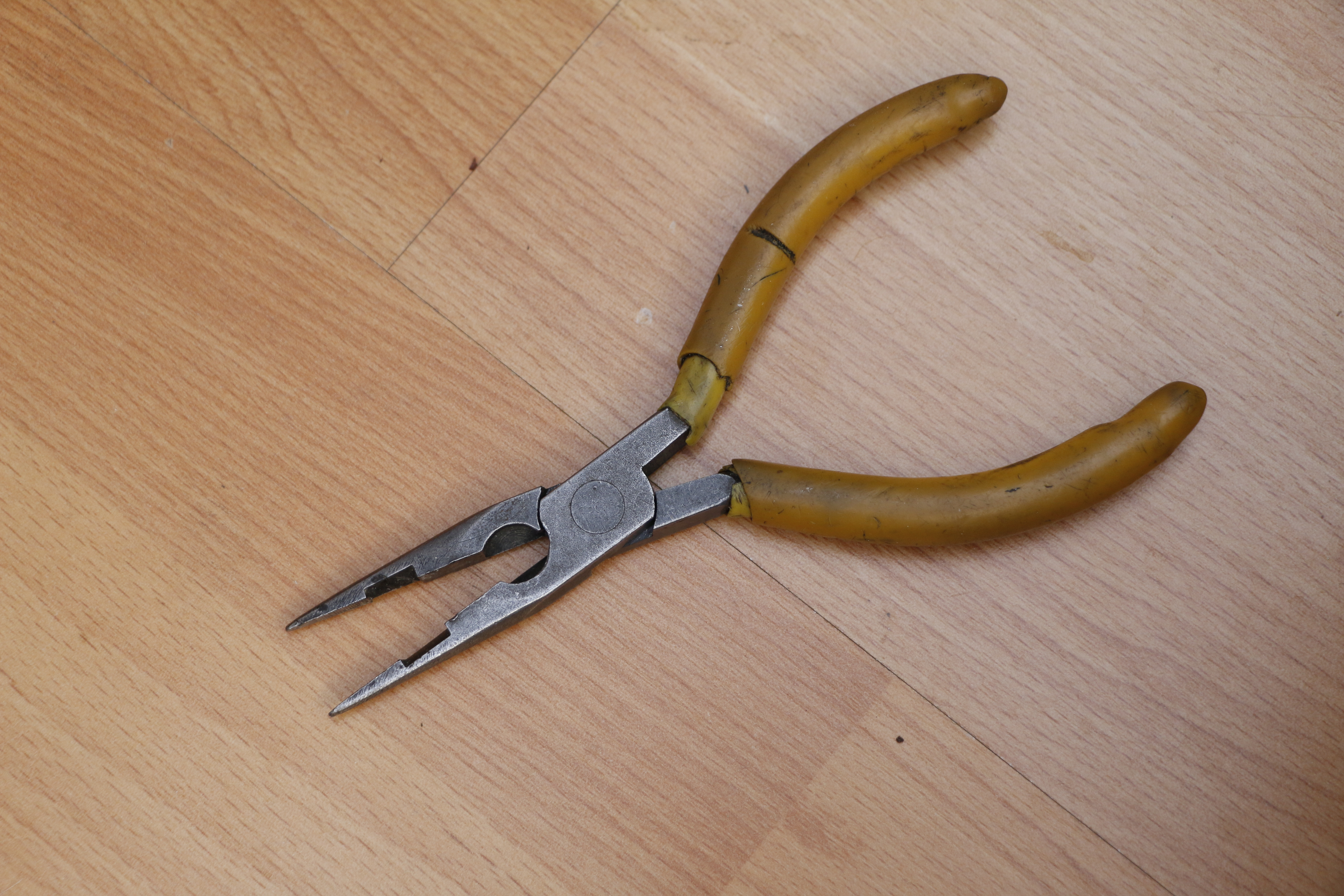
Wiring pliers with separate cutting edge and stripping section for 0.5mm conductor.

== See also ==
- Lineman's pliers
