= Gas grips =

Gas grips may refer to:

- Pipe wrench
- Tongue-and-groove pliers
- Monkey wrench
