= Klein Tools =

American company

- Type: Privately owned
- Industry: Manufacturing
- Founded: 1857; 169 years ago
- Founder: Mathias Klein
- Headquarters: Mansfield, Texas
- Key people: Thomas R. Klein, Chairman CEO
- Products: Hand tools
- Number of employees: 2,500
- Website: www.kleintools.com

Klein Tools, Inc. is an American company based in Lincolnshire, IL that manufactures hand tools. The company is known for its popularity with workers in the electrical and telecommunications industries. Lineman's pliers in the past were often called "Kleins," an example of a genericized trademark.

Klein's line-up contains more than 5,000 different tools, including 165 different types of pliers, in addition to screwdrivers, nut drivers, wire pulling and stripping tools, crimping tools, scissors, snips and shears, cable and bolt cutters, multimeters, electrical outlet testers, conduit benders, personal protective equipment, and tool bags. Klein produces a high-end line of tools under its Journeyman label.

== History ==
Klein Tools was founded in 1857 in Chicago, Illinois by German immigrant Mathias Klein. The first tool Klein made was a pair of side-cutting pliers for a telegraph lineman. The company grew as the telegraph and eventually telephone and electrical industries grew after the Civil War by adding 100 types of pliers in the 1910s. From the 1960s-1980s, the company expanded their product line to include leather and canvas products, occupational safety equipment, hex key wrenches, screwdrivers, nut drivers, as well as electrical terminals and connectors. Along the way, Klein acquired the R.H. Buhrke Company of Fort Smith, Arkansas in 1968 and the Vaco Products Company of Jonesville, Michigan in 1986. Also in the mid 1980s, the company started manufacturing adjustable wrenches in the US, which they had previously been purchasing from a Japanese supplier.

Klein Tools built a drop forging plant in Moran, Kansas and distribution center in Cedar Rapids, Iowa before the 1990s. The company added an affiliate, Klein Connection, to help ensure a wider distribution of Klein products. Klein Connection is an e-commerce website.

In December 2011, the company announced that it was closing its plants in Skokie and Roselle, and moving their operations to Texas. Later that year, 2011, they opened their new advanced manufacturing facility in Mansfield, Texas. In 2014, they opened their new heat-treating facility and announced plans to expand on their 100 acres in Mansfield. In 2015, Klein added another 300,000 sf of plastic injection molding and machining, and in 2020 added an additional 270,000 sq. ft. Distribution Center. In 2021, Klein Tools moved its corporate headquarters to Mansfield, TX. The company is still owned and managed by members of the Klein family.

Klein Tools currently has offices and facilities in Fort Smith, AR; Lincolnshire, IL; Philadelphia, PA; Bolivar, NY; Mansfield, TX, Forging & Design, operations in Elk Grove Village, IL.

In September 2018, Klein Tools acquired Saint Paul-based Ergodyne, a manufacturer of safety work gear.

In September 2013, Klein Tools acquired Australian-based Mumme Tools, a manufacturer of mining tools. In February 2019, Klein Tools acquired Australian-based brands Wattmaster and Alco to further extend their Australian operations.

== Sponsorships ==
Klein Tools got involved in motorsports in 1994 to gain visibility with auto racing fans. Drivers of Klein-backed cars included Jacques Villeneuve, who won the Indianapolis 500 and the CART championship in 1995; and Dan Wheldon (co-major sponsor with Jim Beam) as well as being an associate sponsor for all of Andretti-Green Racing, who won the Indianapolis 500 in 2005.

In 2001, Klein Tools started sponsoring aerobatics pilot Michael Mancuso. He flew the Klein Tools Extra 300L during air shows and at IndyCar events as the official air show of the Indy Racing League.

In November 2026, Klein Tools begun sponsoring the Port Adelaide Football Club for the 2027 AFL season

== Gallery ==
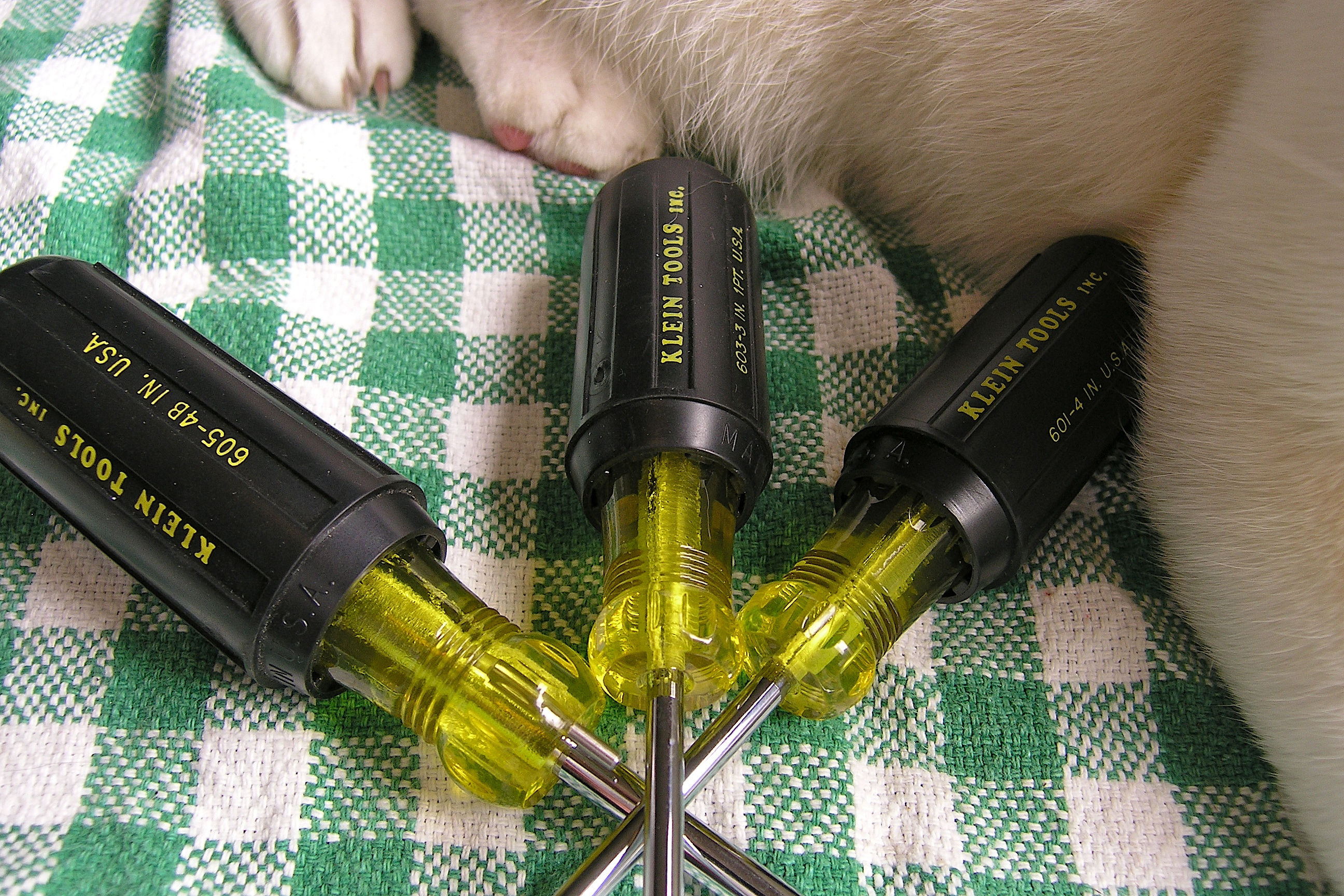
Three Klein screwdrivers, with their distinctive handles.

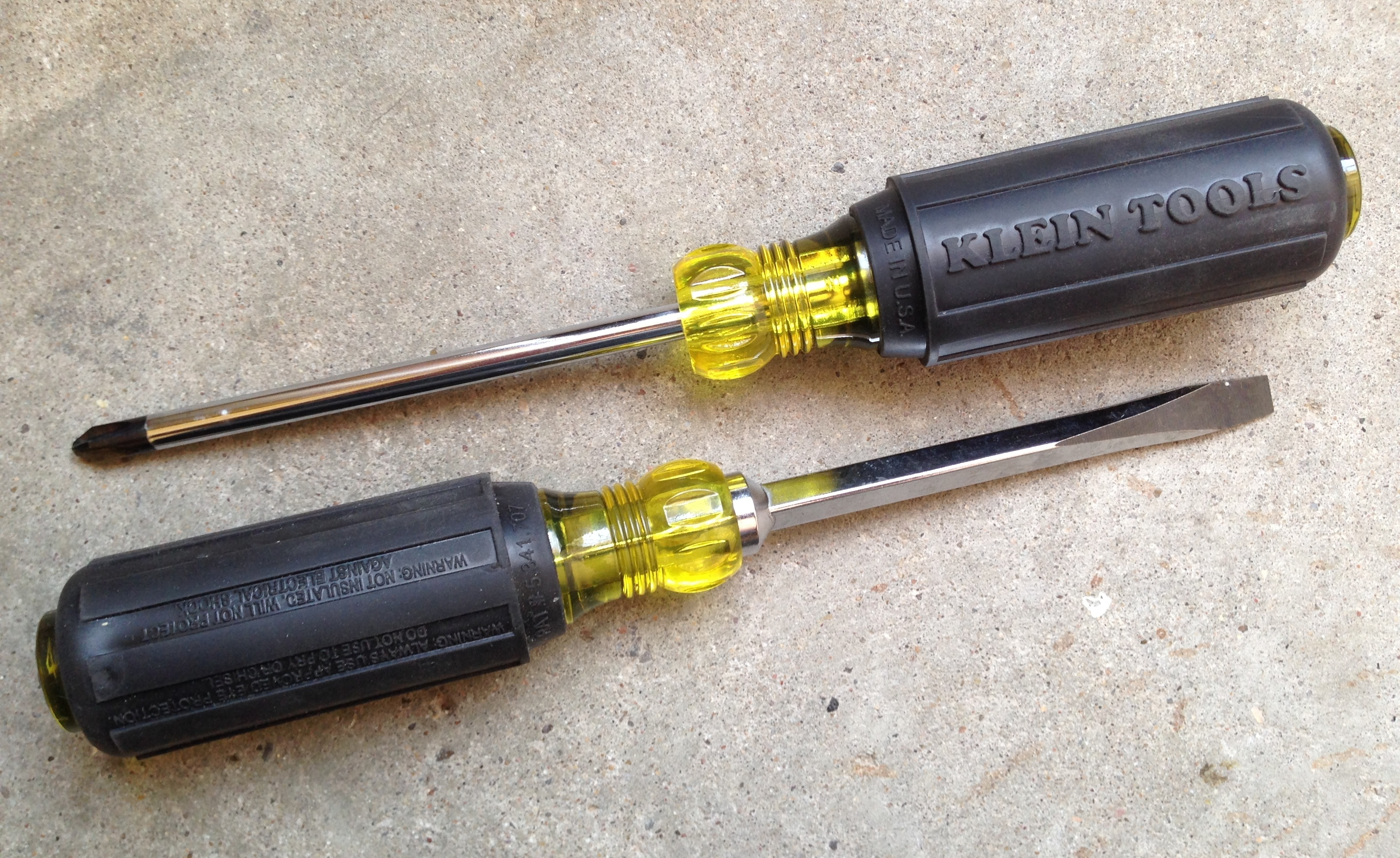
Newer cushion grip screwdrivers.

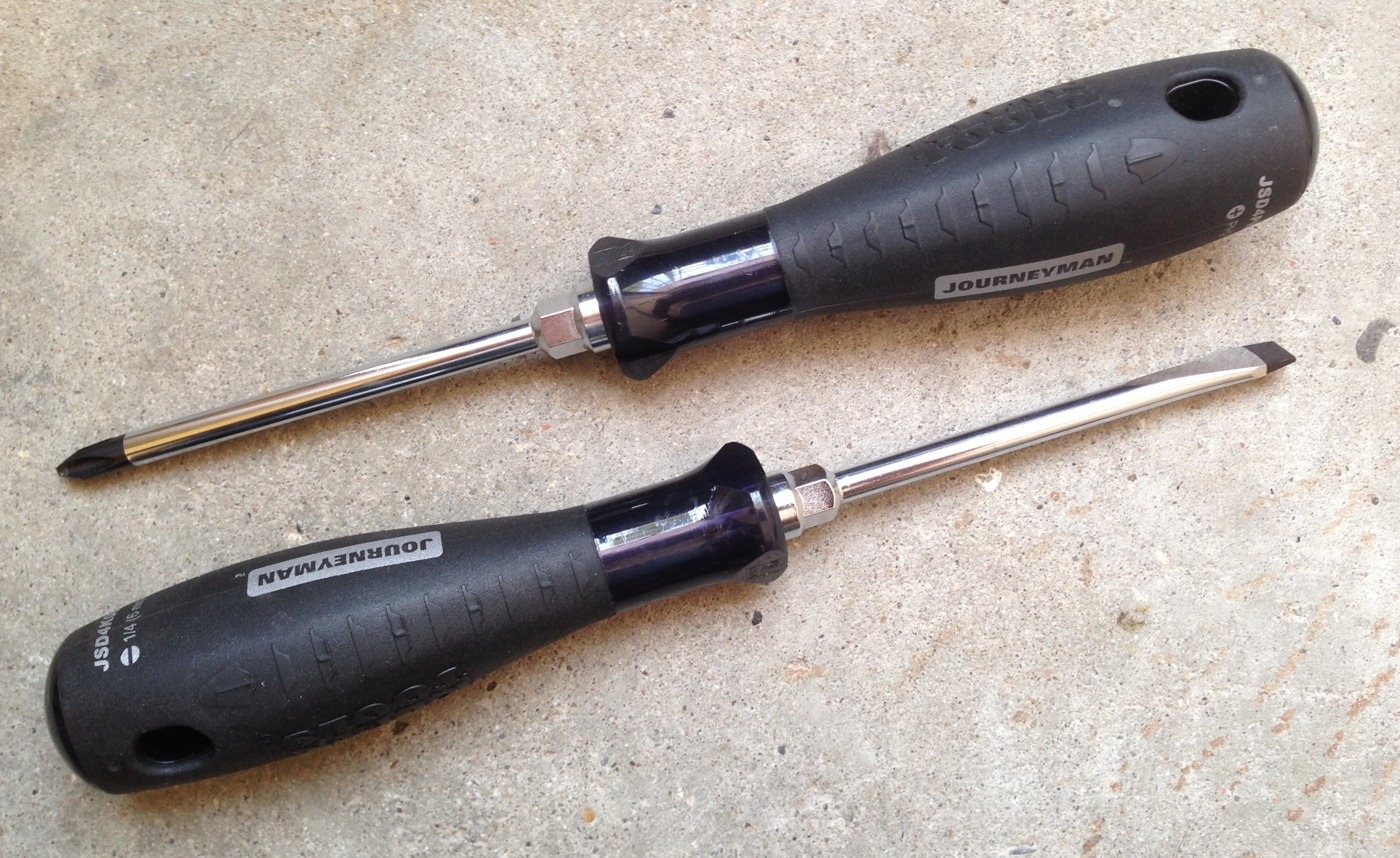
Klein Journeyman screwdrivers.

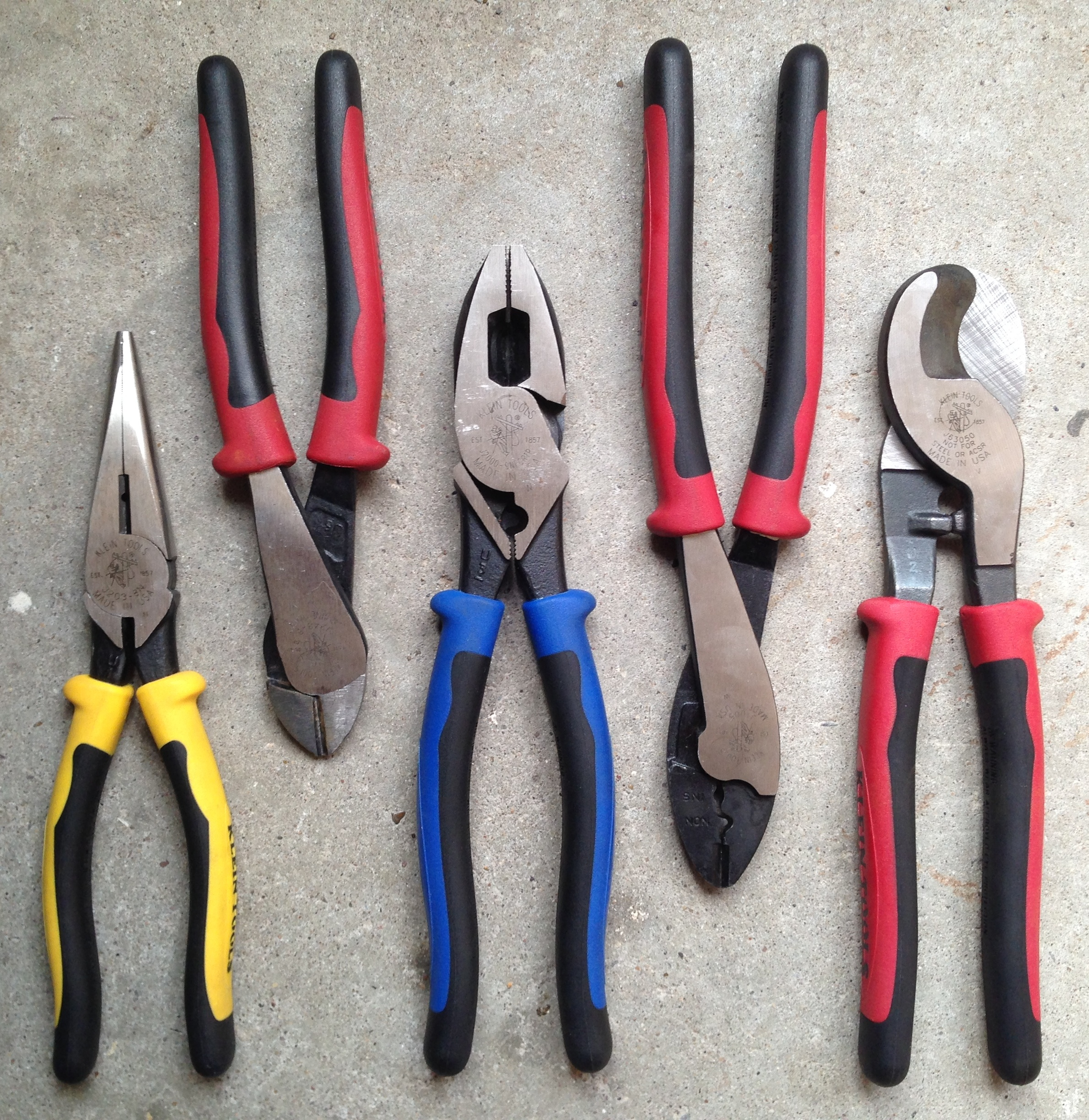
A set of Klein Journeyman pliers.

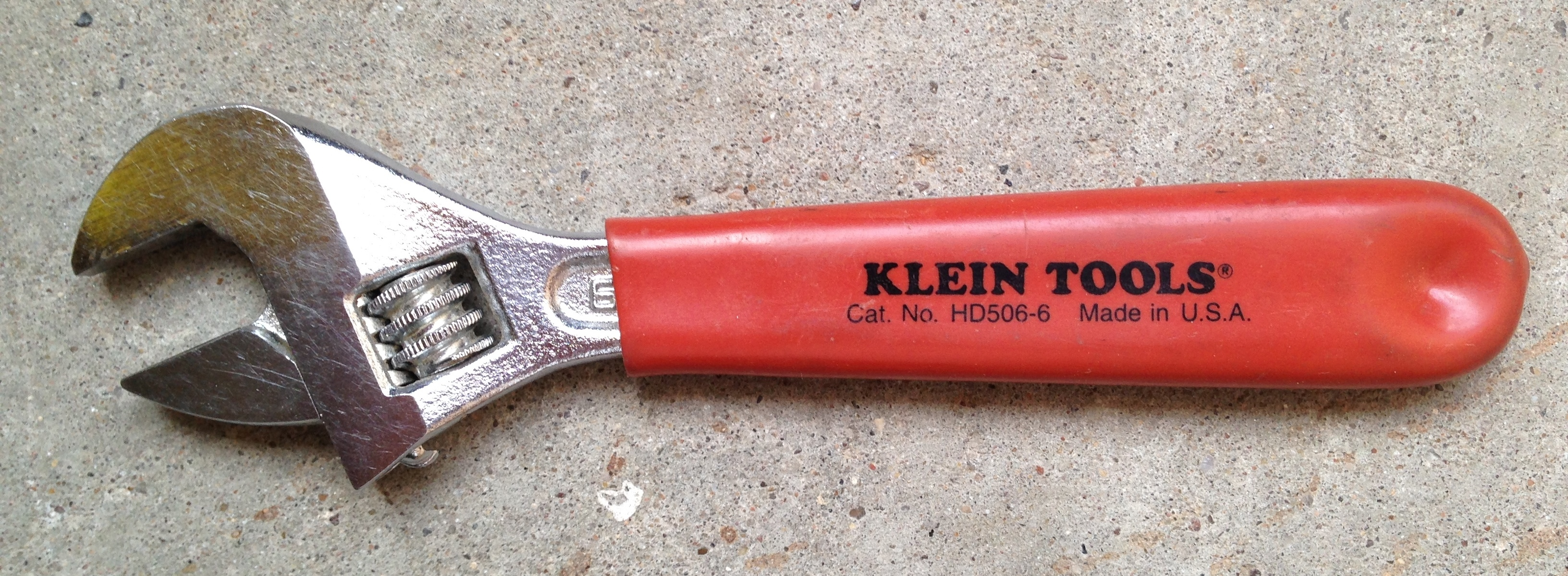
An adjustable wrench.

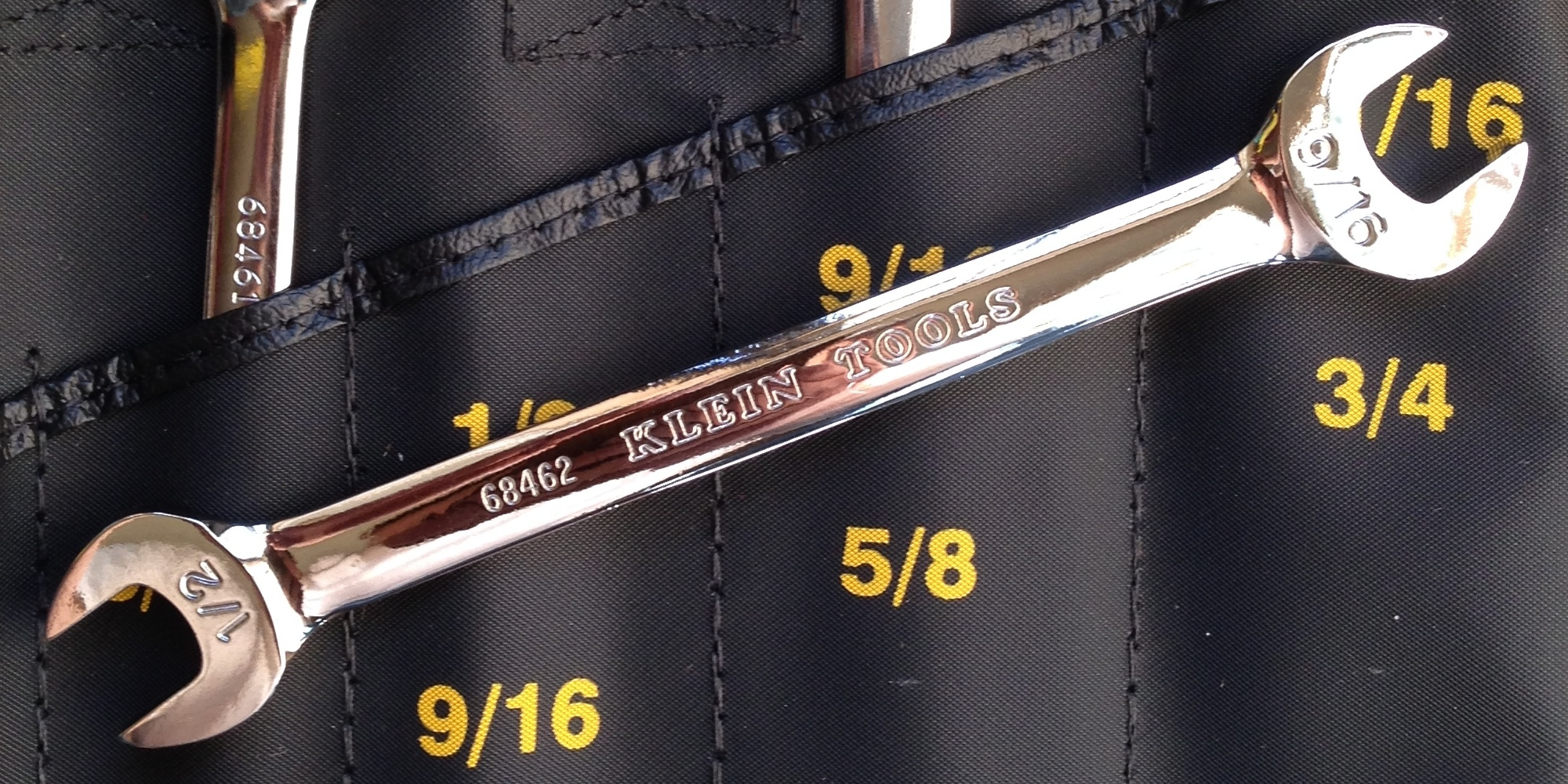
A double open-ended wrench.

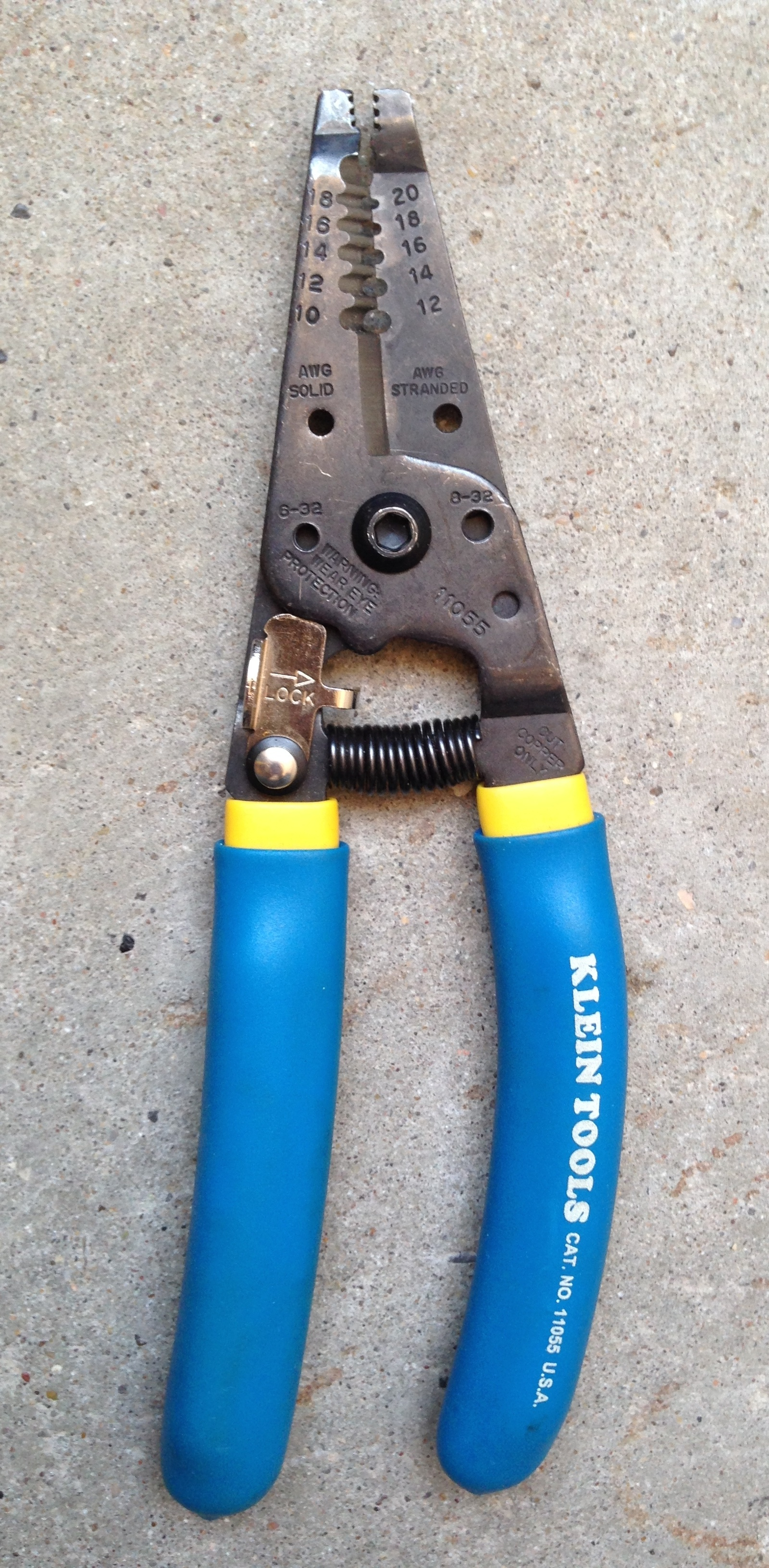
A wire stripper.

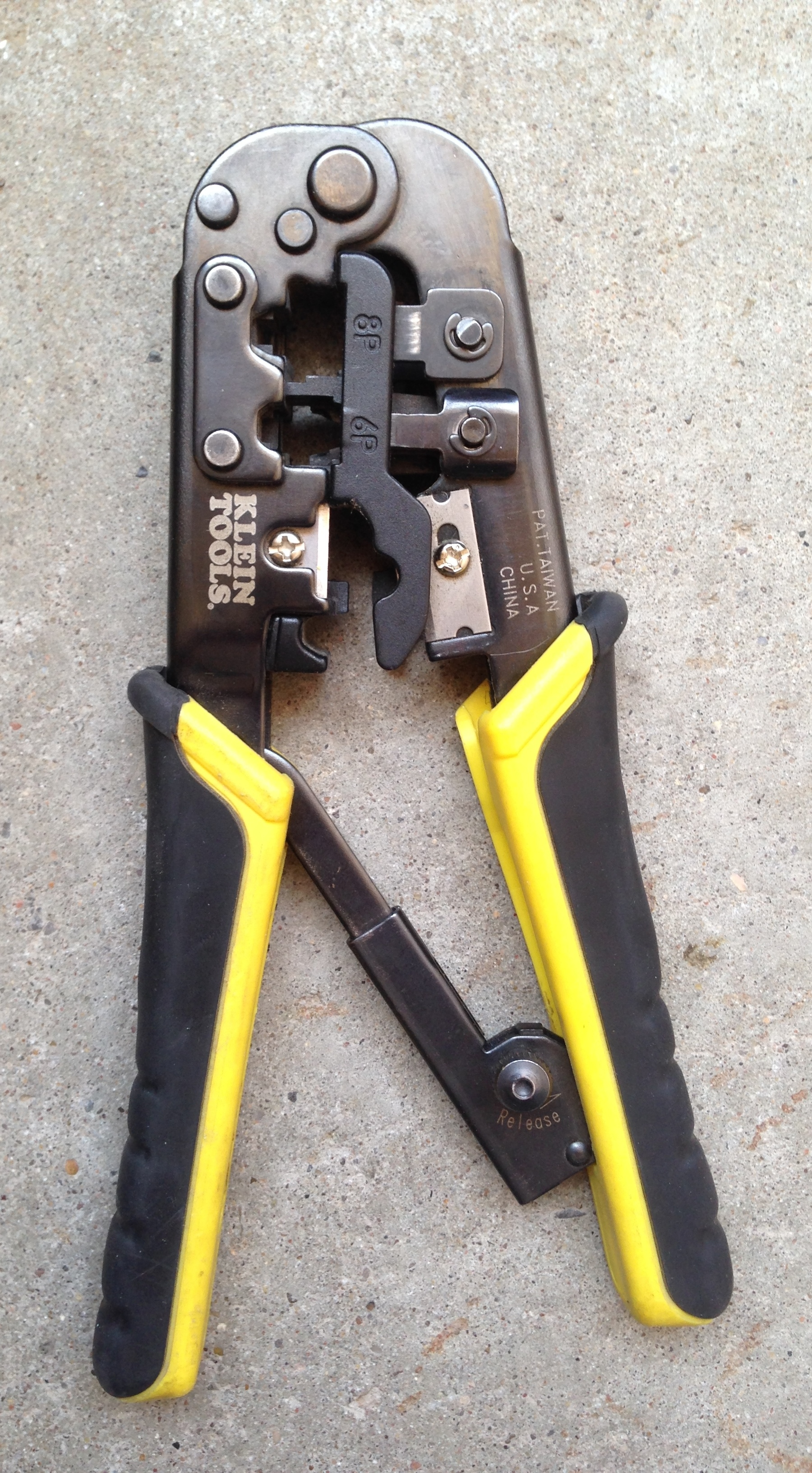
A modular plug crimper.

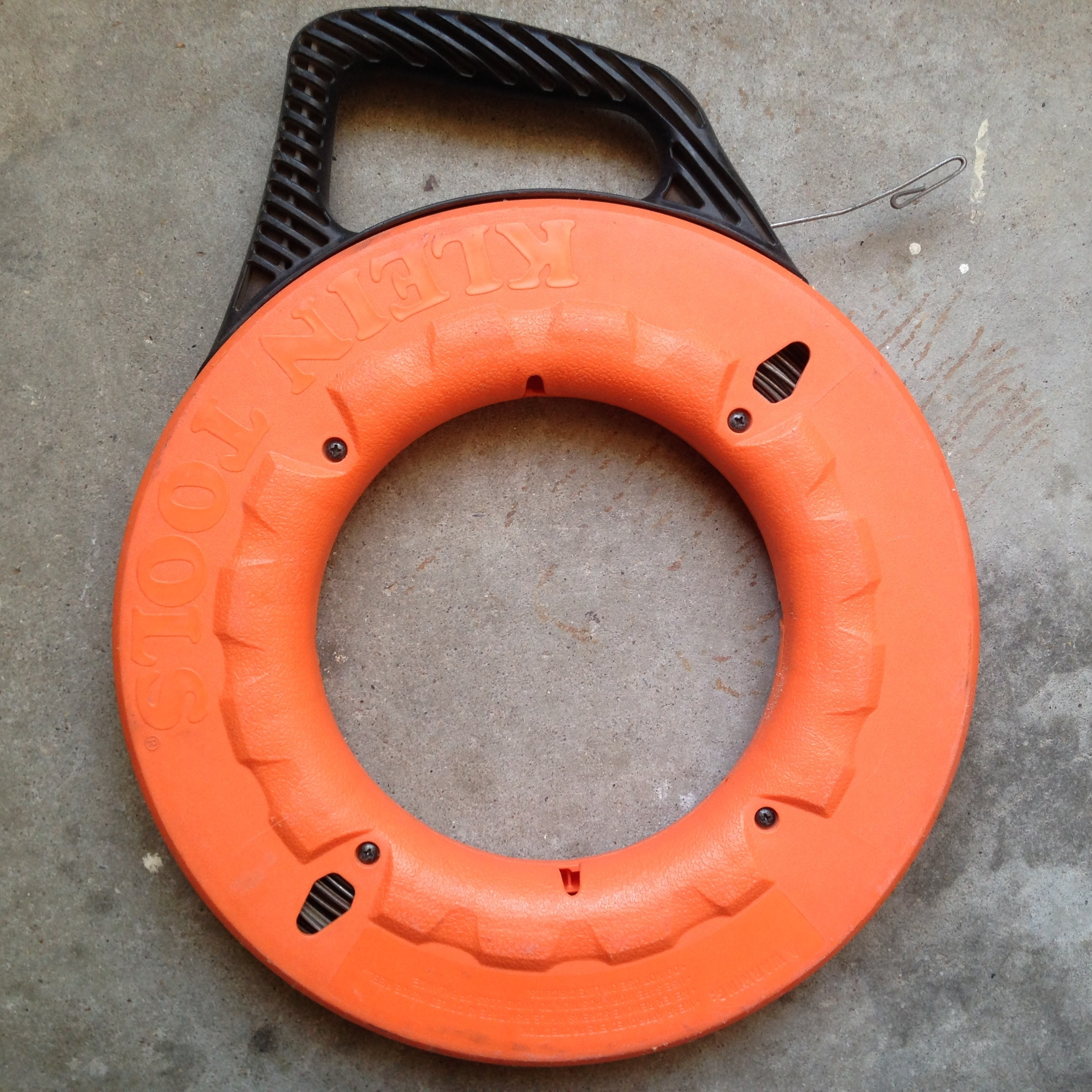
A 240' steel fish tape.

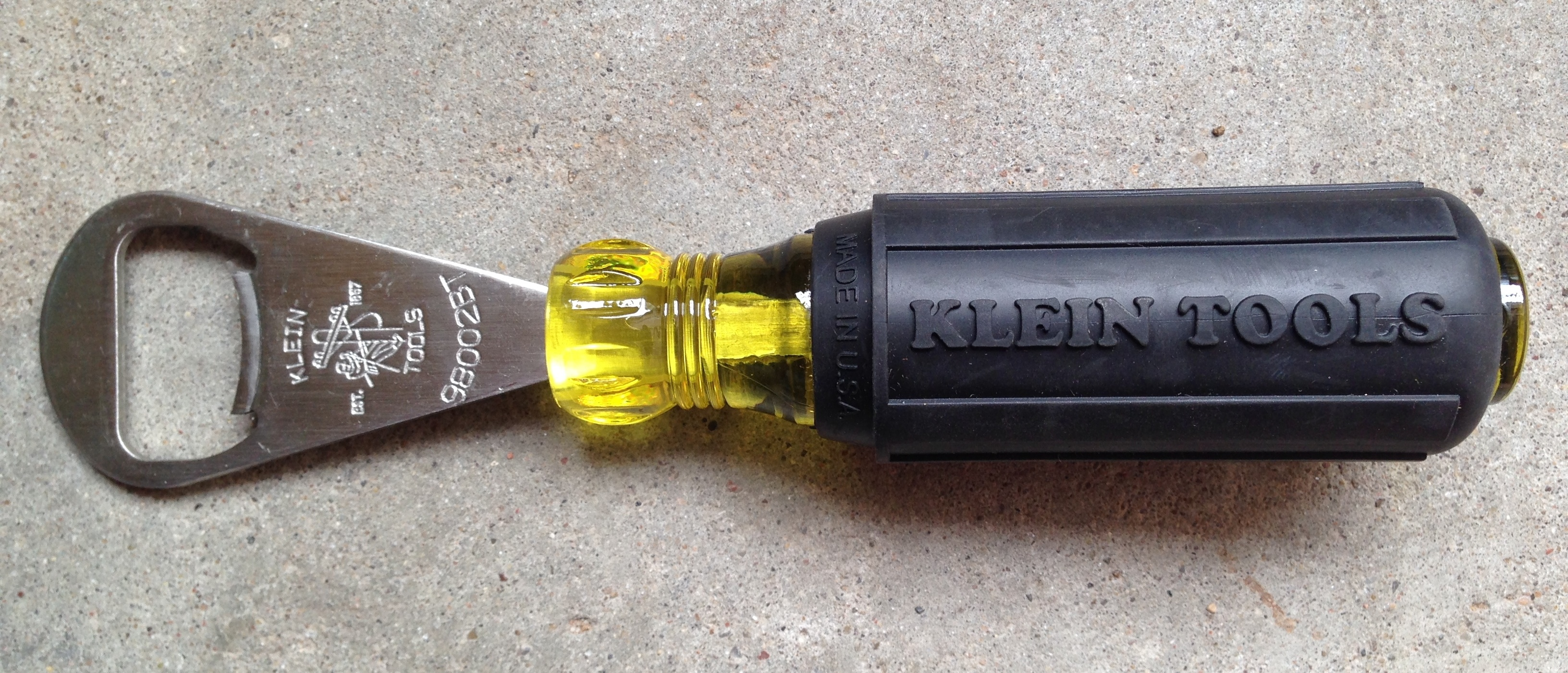
A bottle opener.
