= Pincers (tool) =

Hand tool

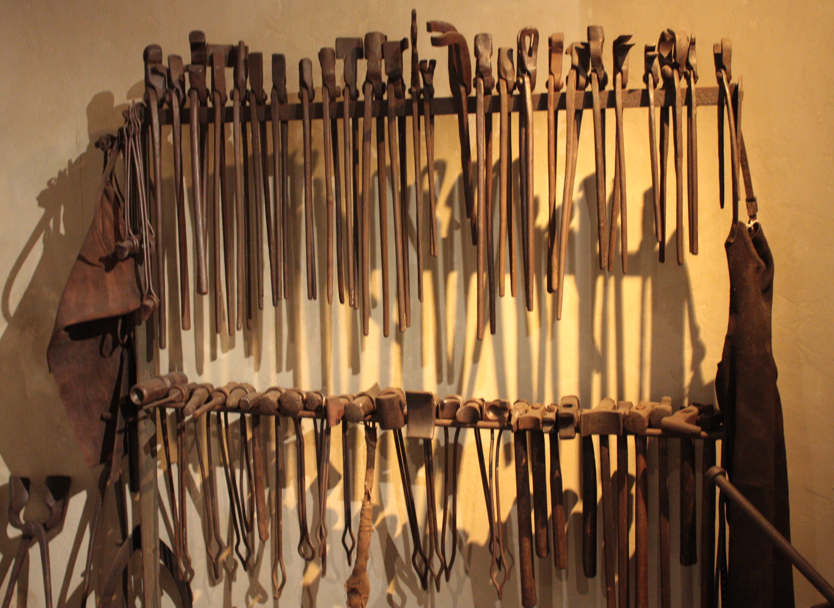
Selection of pincers in a mock-up blacksmiths

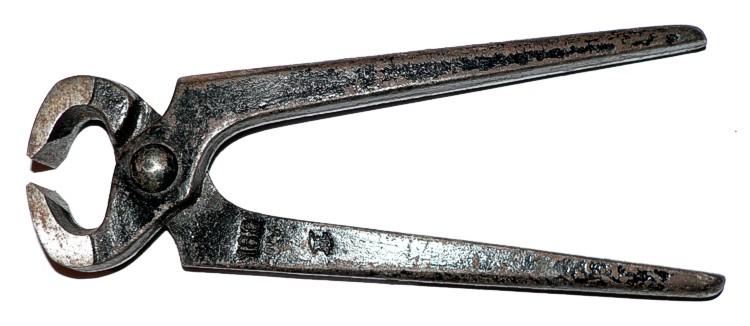
Carpenter's pincers

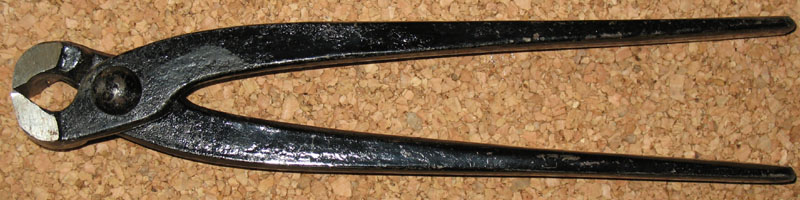
End-cutters

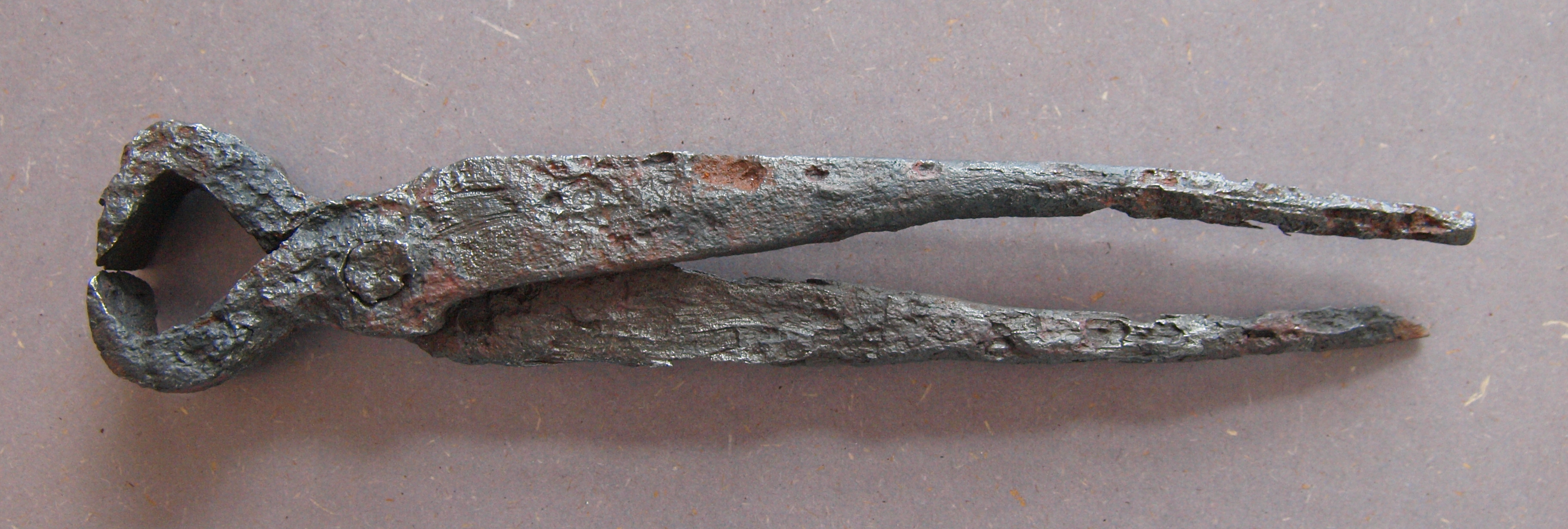
Medieval pincers found in Hamburg-Harburg (15th/16th century)

Pincers are a hand tool used in many situations where a mechanical advantage is required to pinch, cut or pull an object. Pincers are first-class levers, but differ from pliers in that the concentration of force is either to a point, or to an edge perpendicular to the length of the tool. This allows pincers to be brought close to a surface, which is often required when working with nails.

Pincers are primarily used for removing objects (typically nails) out of a material that they have been previously applied to. Carpenter's pincers are particularly suited to these tasks.

Sharpened pincers are also used to cut away natural calluses, also called chestnuts, from a horses body.

Further use of pincers is the trimming of the edges of horses' hoofs.

If the pincers have perpendicular cutting edges, the pincers are often called end-nippers or end-cutters. They're often used in jewelry making, for trimming flat wire or cutting off the end of an ear stud.

Pincers, often red-hot, have also been used as an instrument of torture since ancient Roman times or earlier.

Pliers are a similar tool with a different type of head used for squeezing, rather than cutting and pulling.

== See also ==
- Chela (organ)
- Pincer (biology)
