= Slip joint pliers =

Hand tool with moveable parts

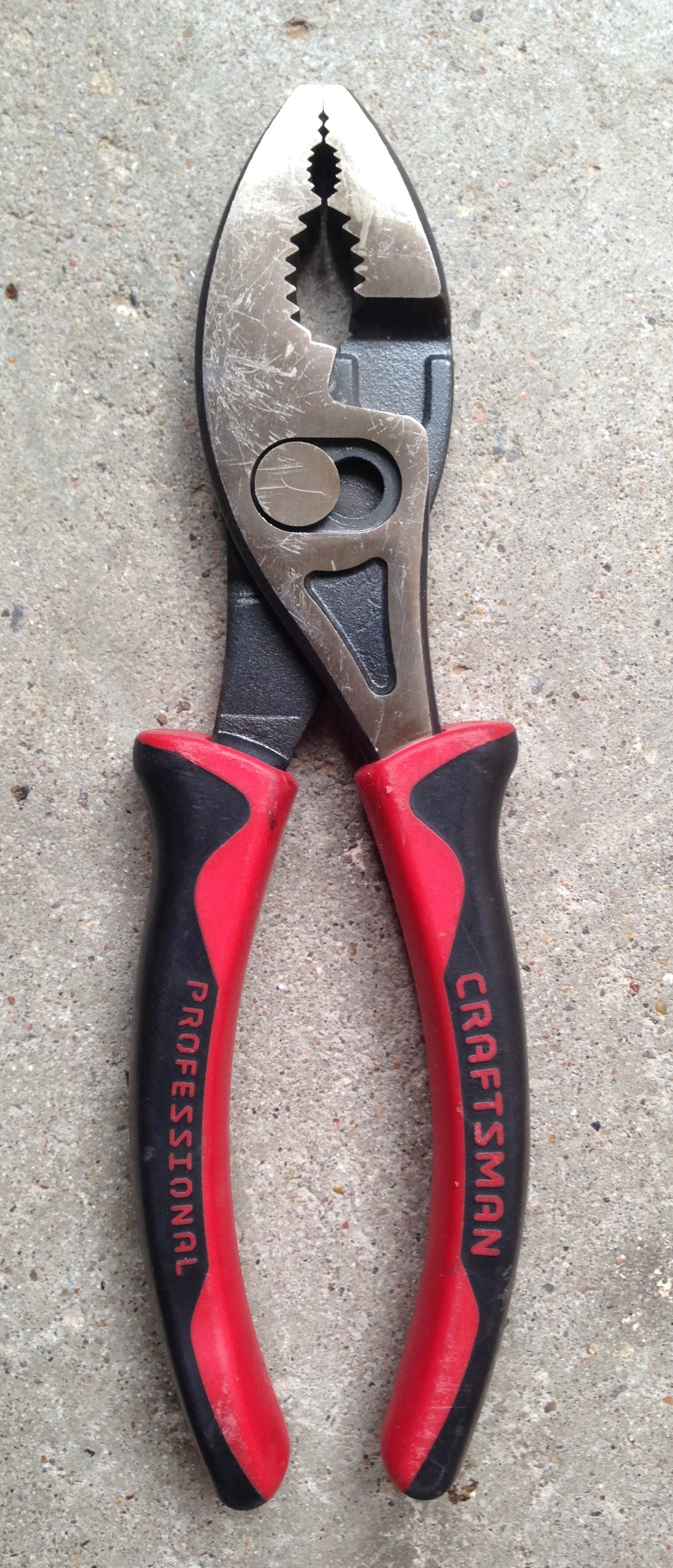
Narrow position.

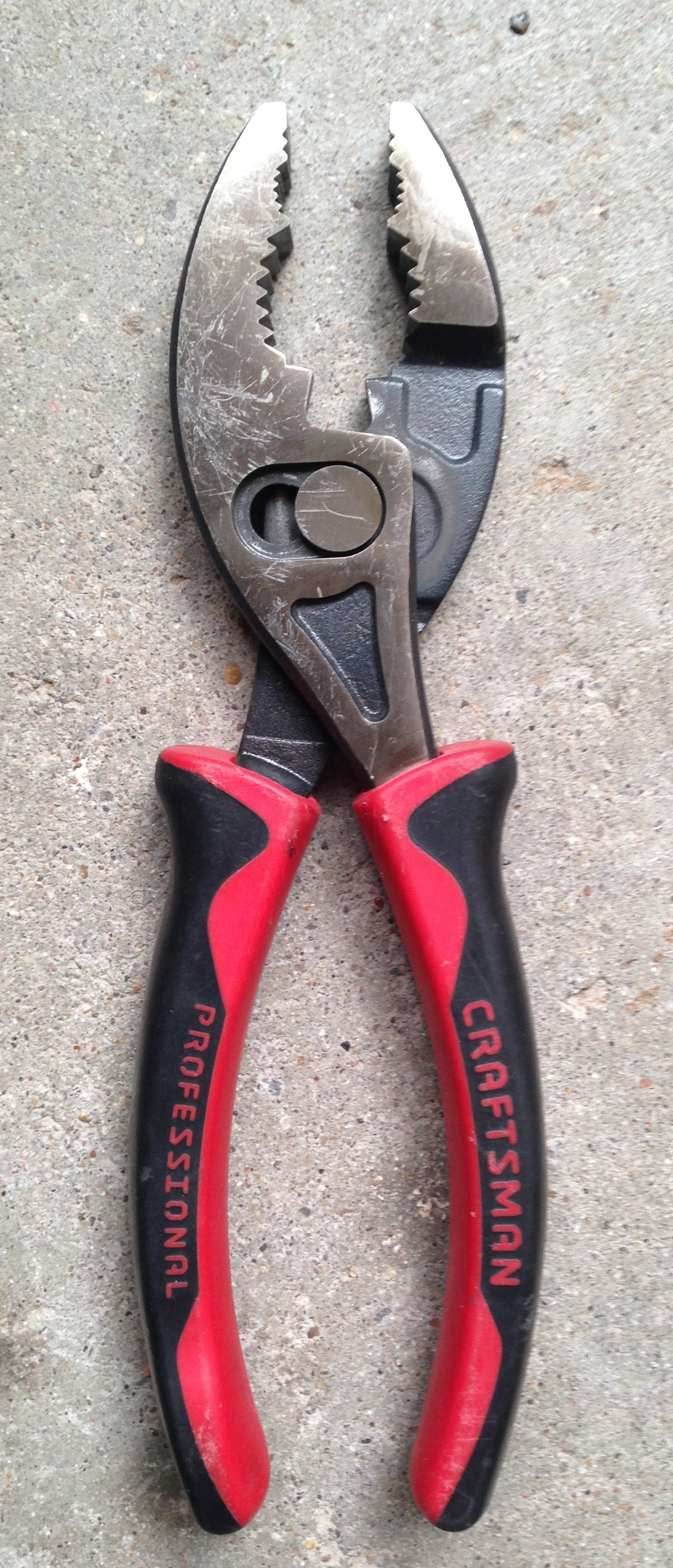
Wide position.

Slip joint pliers are pliers whose pivot point or fulcrum can be moved to increase the size range of their jaws.

Jaws can be thick, thin, regular and multiple. Multiple ones are those slip joint pliers that provide 2 or more pivoting positions.

== Varieties ==
There are many different varieties of slip joint pliers, including straight slip joint pliers, tongue-and-groove pliers.

=== Straight slip joint pliers ===
Straight slip joint pliers are configured similarly to common or lineman's pliers in that their jaws are in line with their handles. One side of the pliers usually has two holes that are connected by a slot for the pivot. The pivot is fastened to the other side and shaped such that it can slide through the slot when the pliers are fully opened.

=== Tongue-and-groove pliers ===
Tongue-and-groove pliers have their jaws offset from their handles and have several positions at which the lower jaw can be positioned.
