= Nipper (tool) =

Tool used to remove small amounts of hard material

A nipper or tile nipper (like a pair of scissors or pliers) is a tool used to "nip" or remove small amounts of a hard material, such as pieces of a tile, which needs to be fitted around an odd or irregular shape.

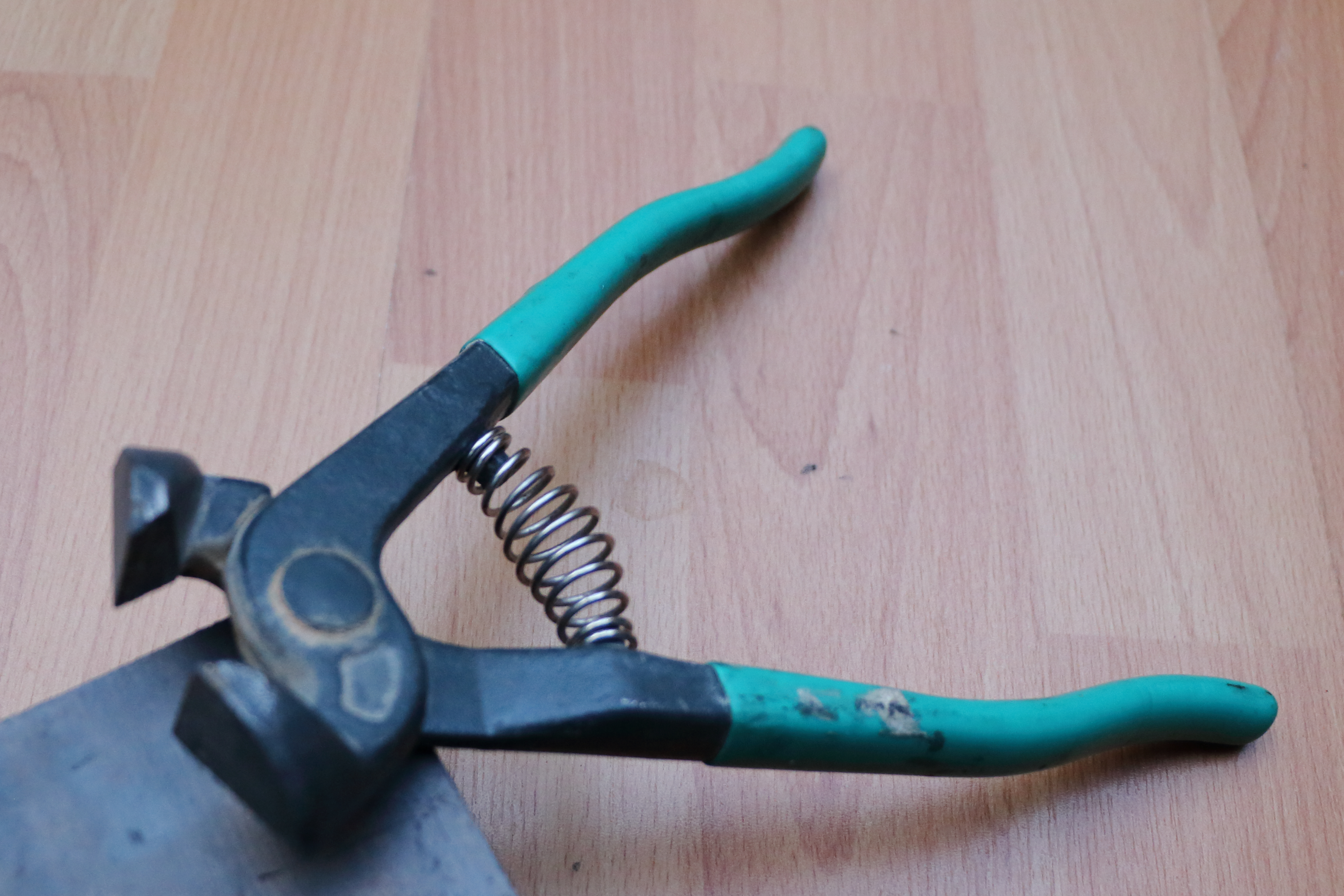
Drop forged tile nippers with soft plastic handle sheaths.

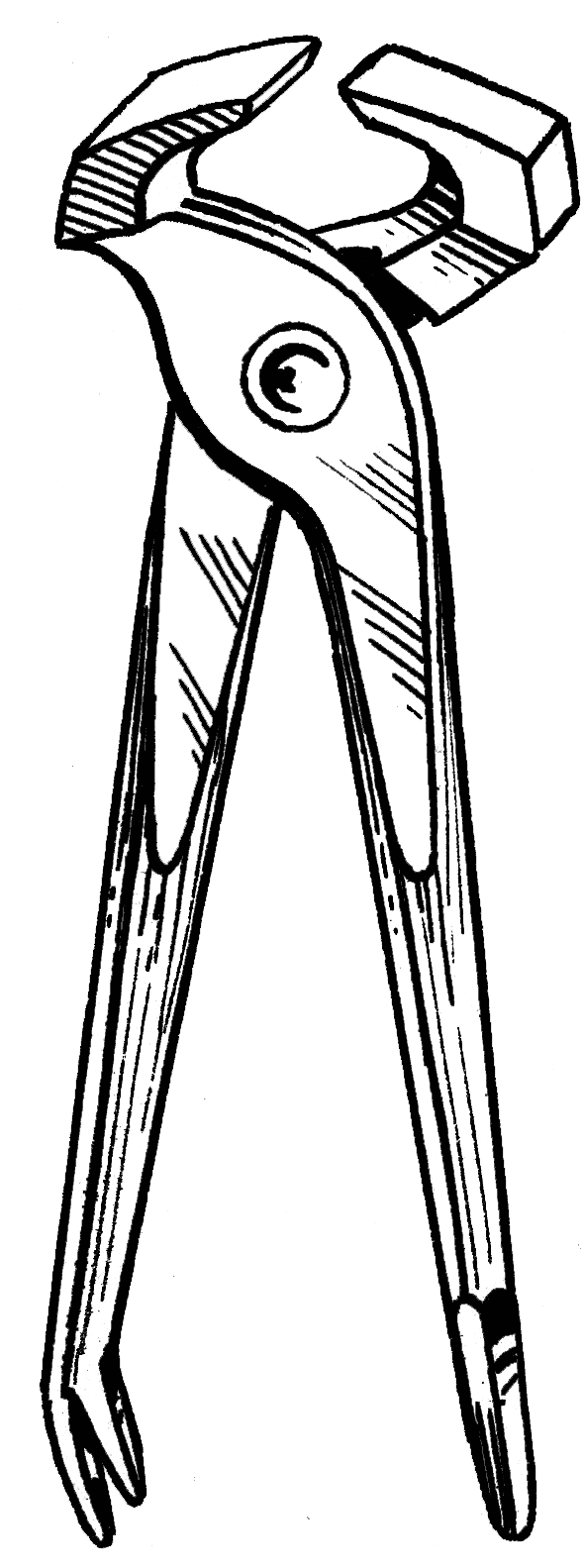
Drawing of a hoof nipper.

For tile that requires a straight cut a tile cutter is used. This is a small mechanical device where the tile is placed, aligned and clamped on a platform; lightly "scored" with a cutting wheel and snapped in two with a handled slicer (blade similar to a paper cutter in appearance). For larger jobs an electric tile saw or wet saw is used; this saw is similar to a small mitre saw except that water is distributed on the saw blade to lessen the effects of heat and friction.

A rail nipper is used in rail transport modelling to cut rail tracks.

== See also ==
- Tin snips
- Pliers
- Electrical wire cutting
