= Tongue-and-groove pliers =

Adjustable clamping hand tool

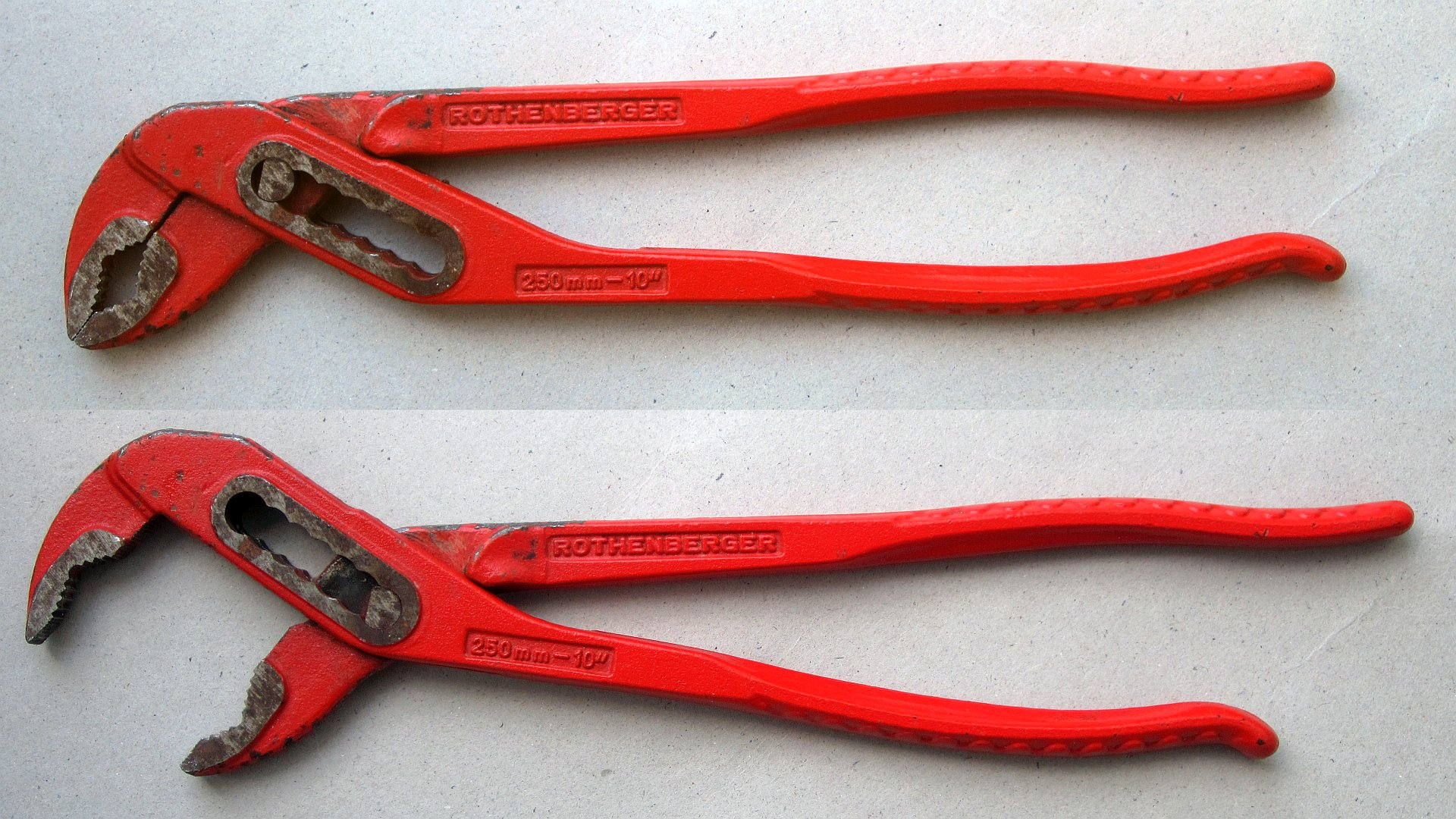
Tongue-and-groove pliers in extreme positions, size 10 in (25 cm)

Tongue-and-groove pliers are a type of slip-joint pliers. They are commonly used for turning and holding nuts and bolts, gripping irregularly shaped objects, and clamping materials. It is also possible to rotate objects while keeping them in one position.

== Names ==
Tongue-and-groove pliers are also known as plumbing pliers, Channellocks (i.e., Channellock brand pliers), water pump pliers (British usage), groove-joint pliers, arc-joint pliers, multi-grips or multigrips (Australian usage), tap or pipe spanners, swan neck pliers, or monkey pliers.

== History ==
Originally developed as a blacksmiths tool, patented in 1899 Canada under CA64246A by Vernon Graham Higgins and sold out of Fortuna, California by the patentee. Advertised in the November 1899 issue of "The Blacksmith and Wheelwright", an American periodical; the original variants had longer reins than the modern equivalent, and may not have had the groves in the jaws.

The current design of pliers was developed and popularized by the Champion–DeArment Tool Company in 1934 under the brand name Channellock (after which the company was later renamed) but are also now produced by a number of other manufacturers.

== Design ==
Tongue-and-groove pliers have serrated jaws generally set 45 to 60 degrees from the handles. The lower jaw can be moved to a number of positions by sliding along a tracking section under the upper jaw. An advantage of this design is that the pliers can adjust to a number of sizes without the distance in the handle growing wider. These pliers often have long handles—commonly 240 to 300 mm (9.5 to 12 inches) long—for increased leverage. The weight of the tool can also vary, depending on the material used.

== Gallery ==
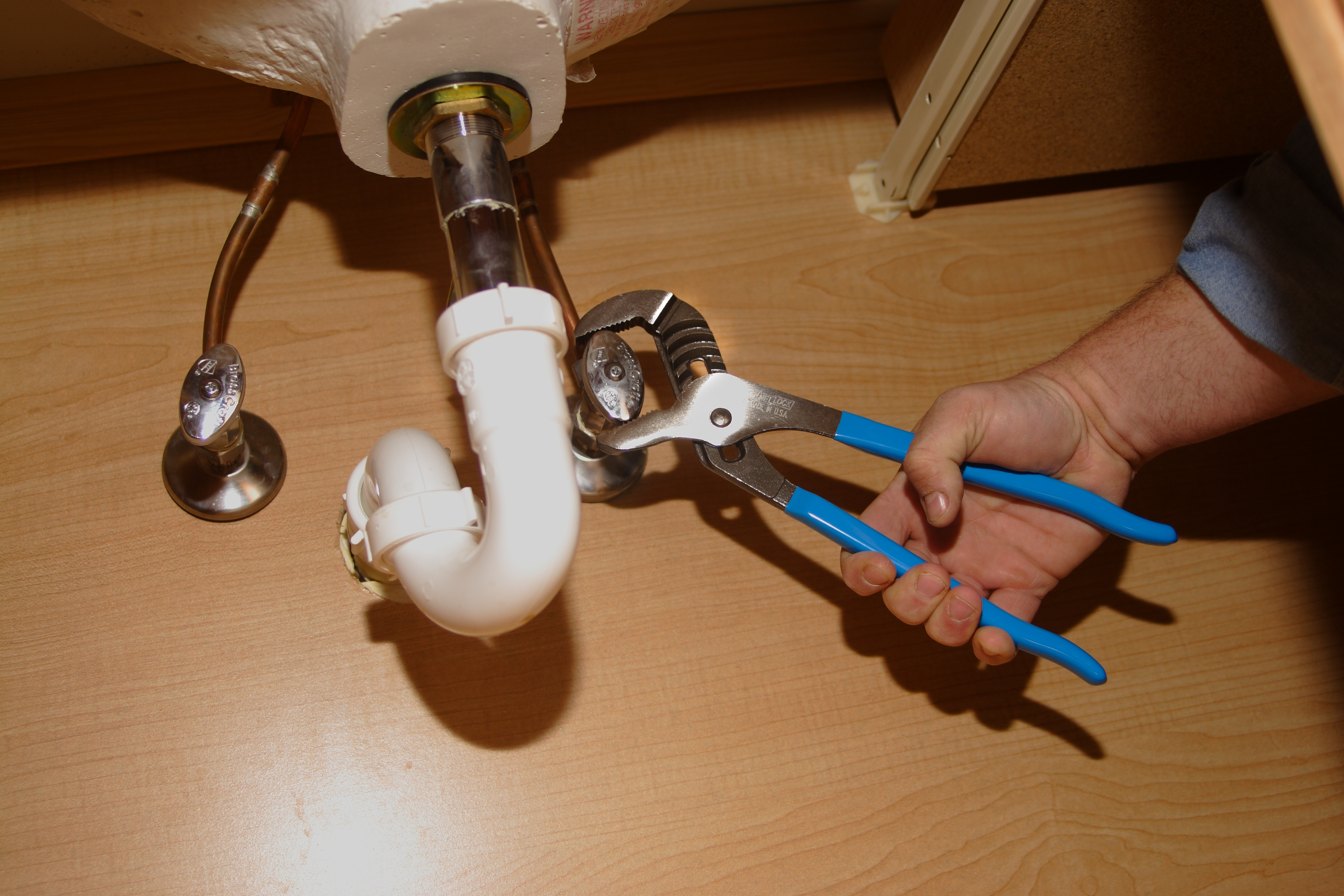

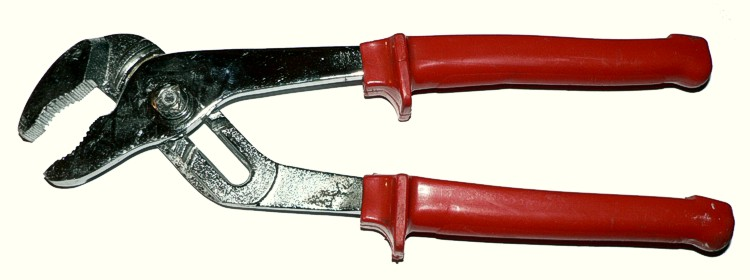

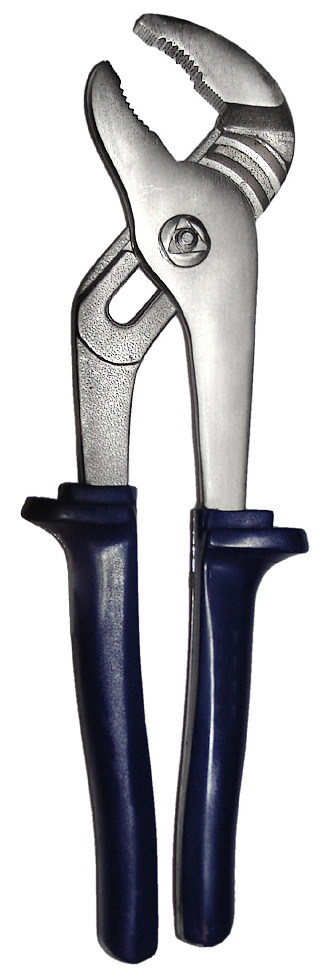

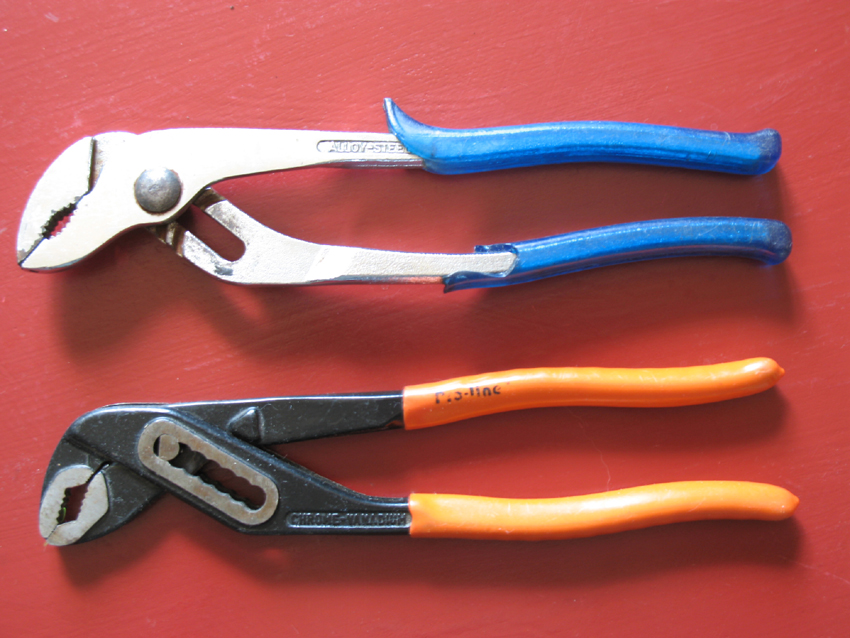

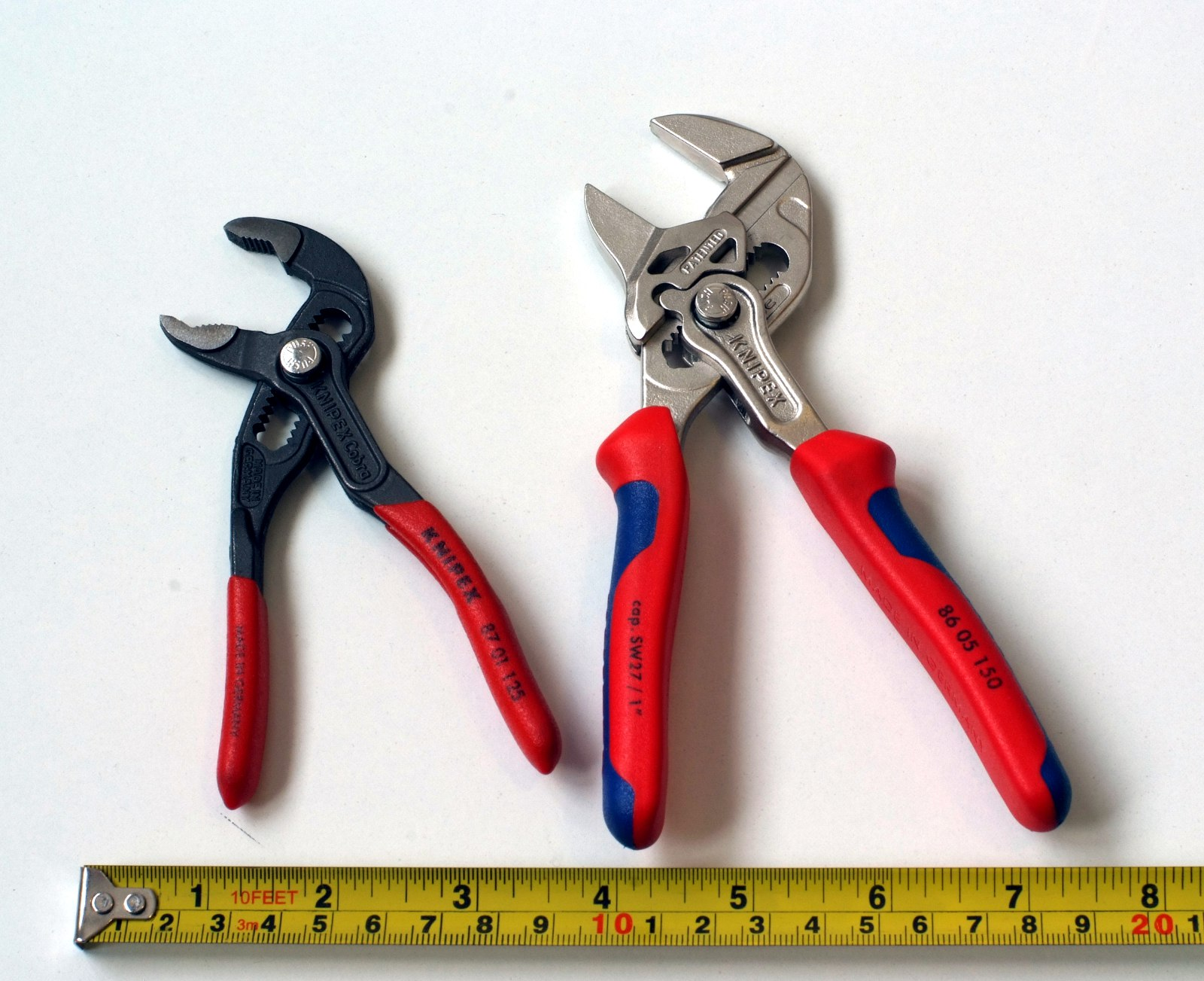
