= Pliers =

Hand tool

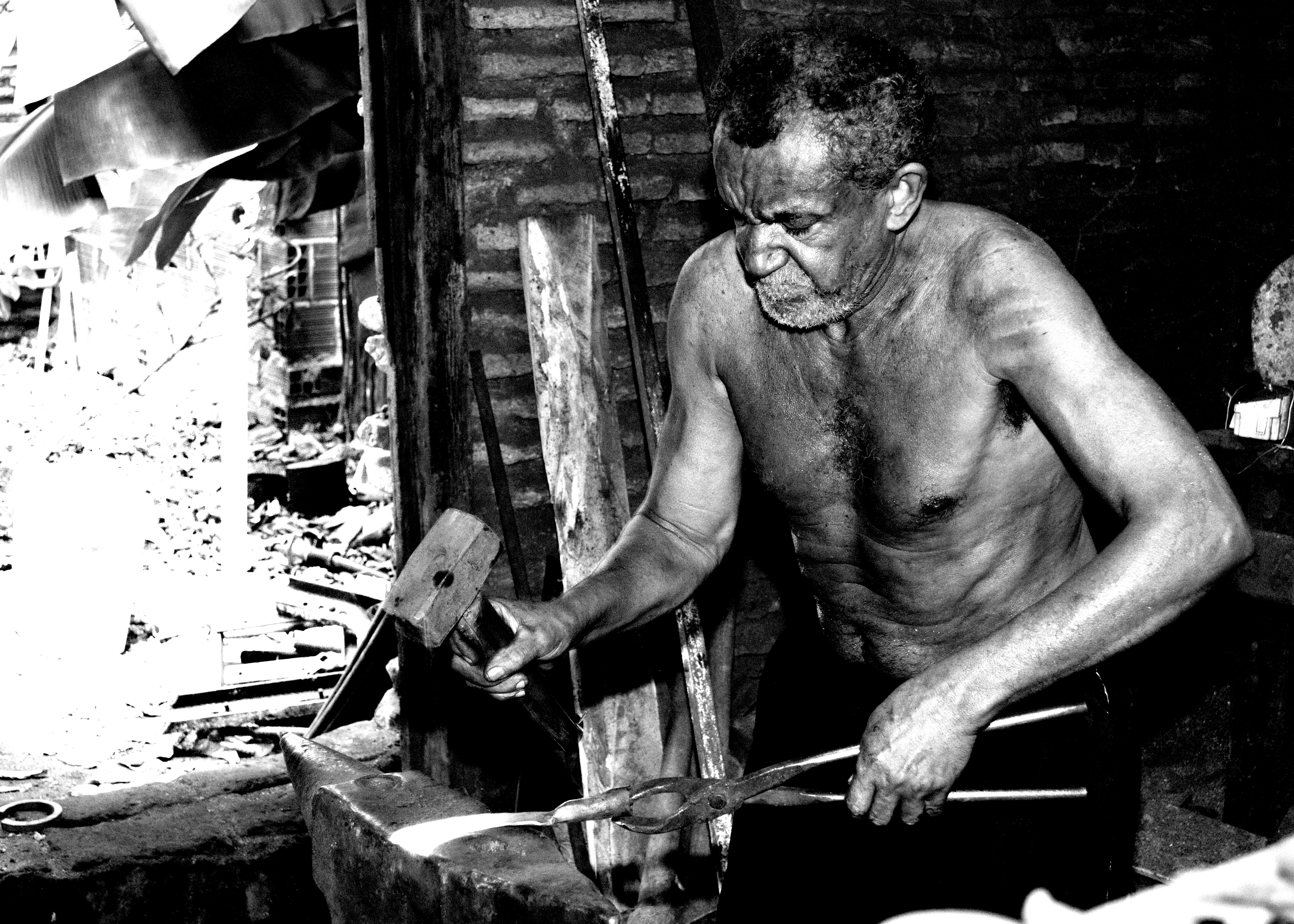
A blacksmith using pliers

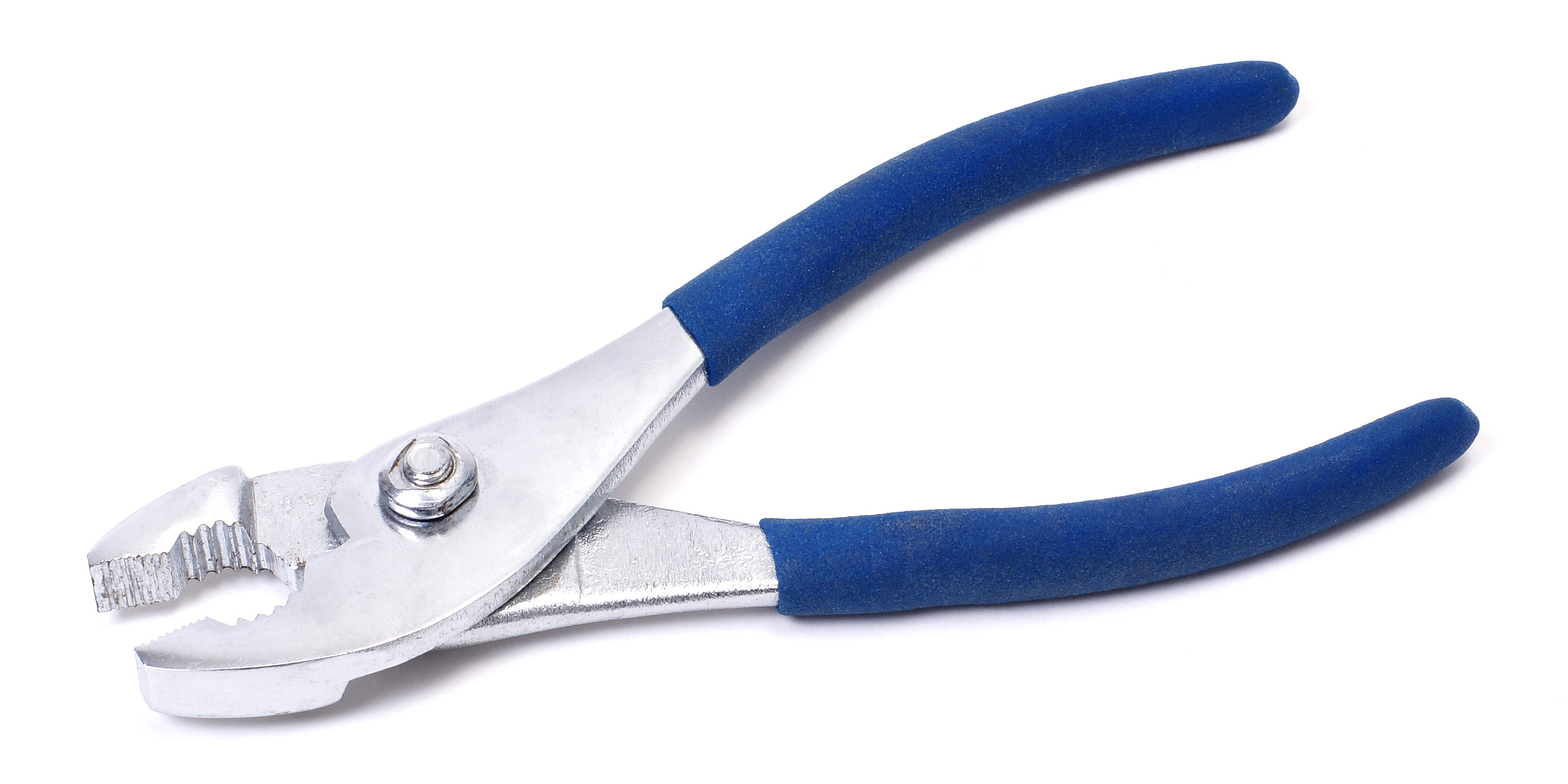
Slip joint pliers

Cutting wire with diagonal pliers/side cutters

Pliers are a hand tool used to hold objects firmly, possibly developed from tongs used to handle hot metal in Bronze Age Europe. They are also useful for bending and physically compressing a wide range of materials. Generally, pliers consist of a pair of metal first-class levers joined at a fulcrum positioned closer to one end of the levers, creating short jaws on one side of the fulcrum, and longer handles on the other side. This arrangement creates a mechanical advantage, allowing the force of the grip strength to be amplified and focused on an object with precision. The jaws can also be used to manipulate objects too small or unwieldy to be manipulated with the fingers.

Diagonal pliers, also called side cutters, are a similarly shaped tool used for cutting rather than holding, having a pair of stout blades, similar to scissors except that the cutting surfaces meet parallel to each other rather than overlapping. Ordinary (holding/squeezing) pliers may incorporate a small pair of such cutting blades. Pincers are a similar tool with a different type of head used for cutting and pulling, rather than squeezing. Tools designed for safely handling hot objects are usually called tongs. Special tools for making crimp connections in electrical and electronic applications are often called crimping pliers or crimpers; each type of connection uses its own dedicated tool.

Parallel pliers have jaws that close in parallel to each other, as opposed to the scissor-type action of traditional pliers. They use a box joint system to do this, and it allows them to generate more grip from friction on square and hexagonal fastenings.

There are many kinds of pliers made for various general and specific purposes.

== History ==
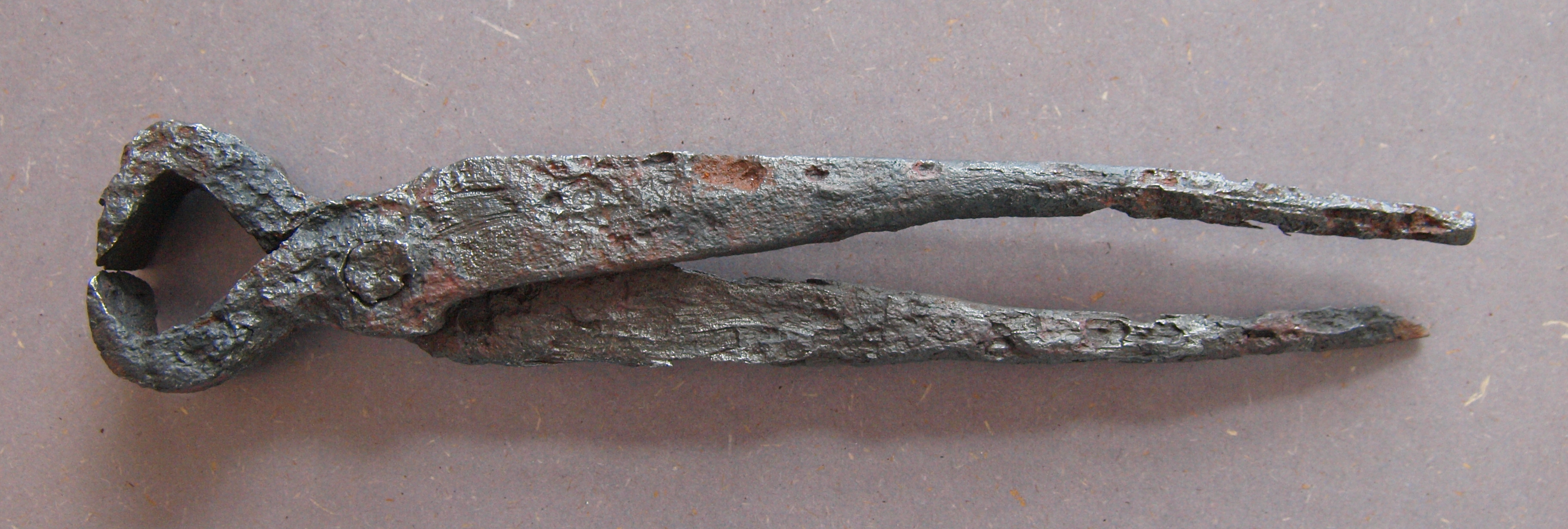
Medieval pincers found in Hamburg-Harburg (15th/16th century)

As pliers in the general sense are an ancient and simple invention, no single inventor can be credited. Early metal working processes from several millennia BCE would have required plier-like devices to handle hot materials in the process of smithing or casting. Development from wooden to bronze pliers would have probably happened sometime prior to 3000 BCE. Among the oldest illustrations of pliers are those showing the Greek god Hephaestus in his forge. The number of different designs of pliers grew with the invention of the different objects which they were used to handle: horseshoes, fasteners, wire, pipes, electrical, and electronic components.

== Design ==
The basic design of pliers has changed little since their origins, with the pair of handles, the pivot (often formed by a rivet), and the head section with the gripping jaws or cutting edges forming the three elements.

The materials used to make pliers consist mainly of steel alloys with additives such as vanadium or chromium, to improve strength and prevent corrosion. The metal handles of pliers are often fitted with grips of other materials to ensure better handling; grips are usually insulated and additionally protect against electric shock. The jaws vary widely in size, from delicate needle-nose pliers to heavy jaws capable of exerting much pressure, and shape, from basic flat jaws to various specialized and often asymmetrical jaw configurations for specific manipulations. The surfaces are typically textured rather than smooth, to minimize slipping.

A plier-like tool designed for cutting wires is often called diagonal pliers. Some pliers for electrical work are fitted with wire-cutter blades either built into the jaws or on the handles just below the pivot.

Where it is necessary to avoid scratching or damaging the workpiece, as for example in jewellery and musical instrument repair, pliers with a layer of softer material such as aluminium, brass, or plastic over the jaws are used.

== Ergonomics ==
Much research has been undertaken to improve the design of pliers, to make them easier to use in often difficult circumstances (such as restricted spaces). The handles can be bent, for example, so that the load applied by the hand is aligned with the arm, rather than at an angle, thus reducing muscle fatigue. It is especially important for factory workers who use pliers continuously and helps prevent carpal tunnel syndrome.

== Types ==
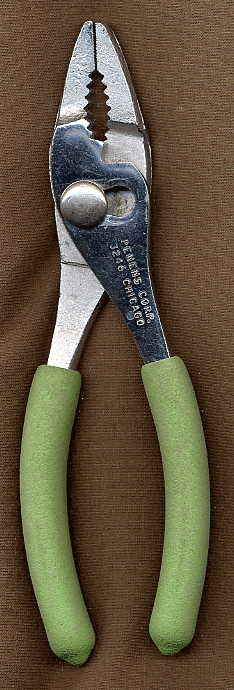
Slip joint pliers

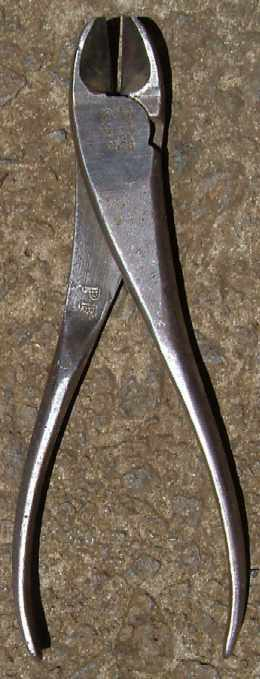
Diagonal pliers or side cutters

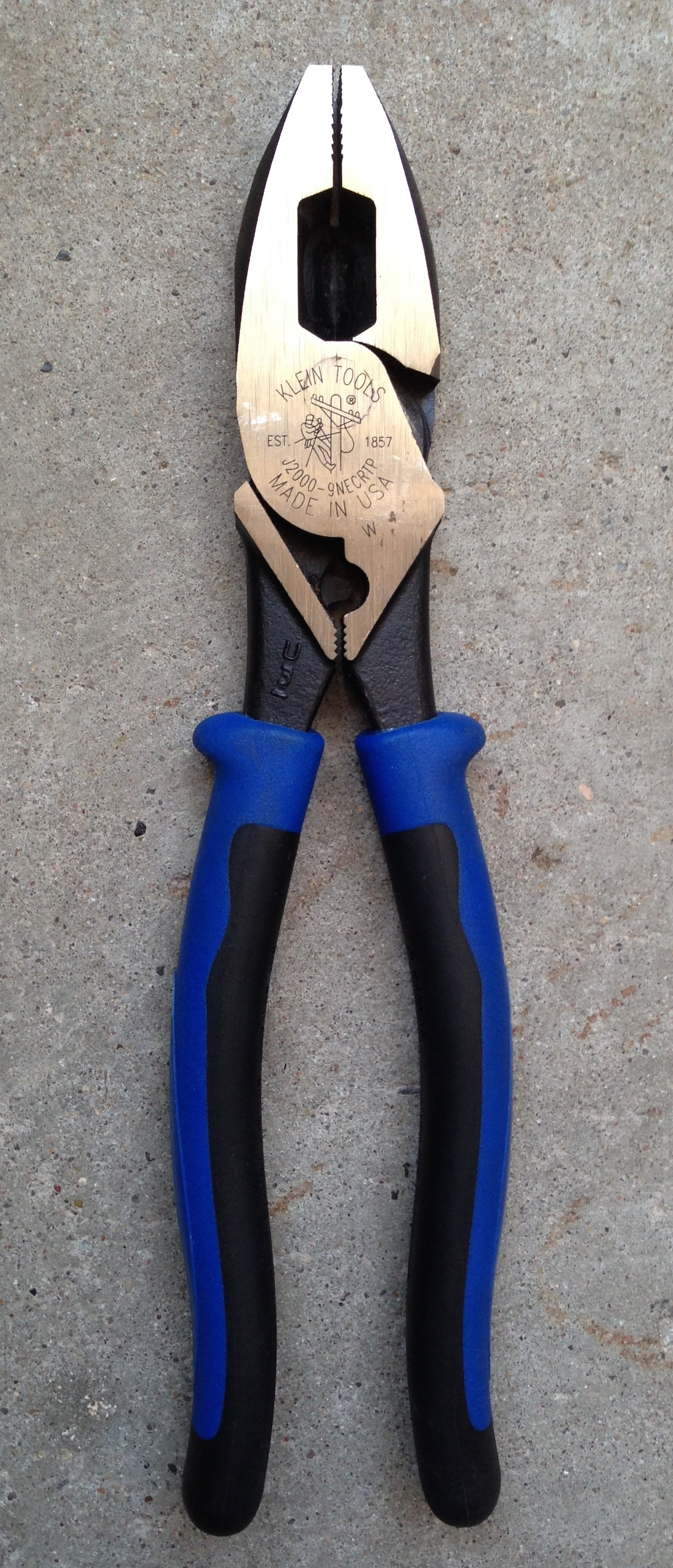
Lineman's pliers or combination pliers

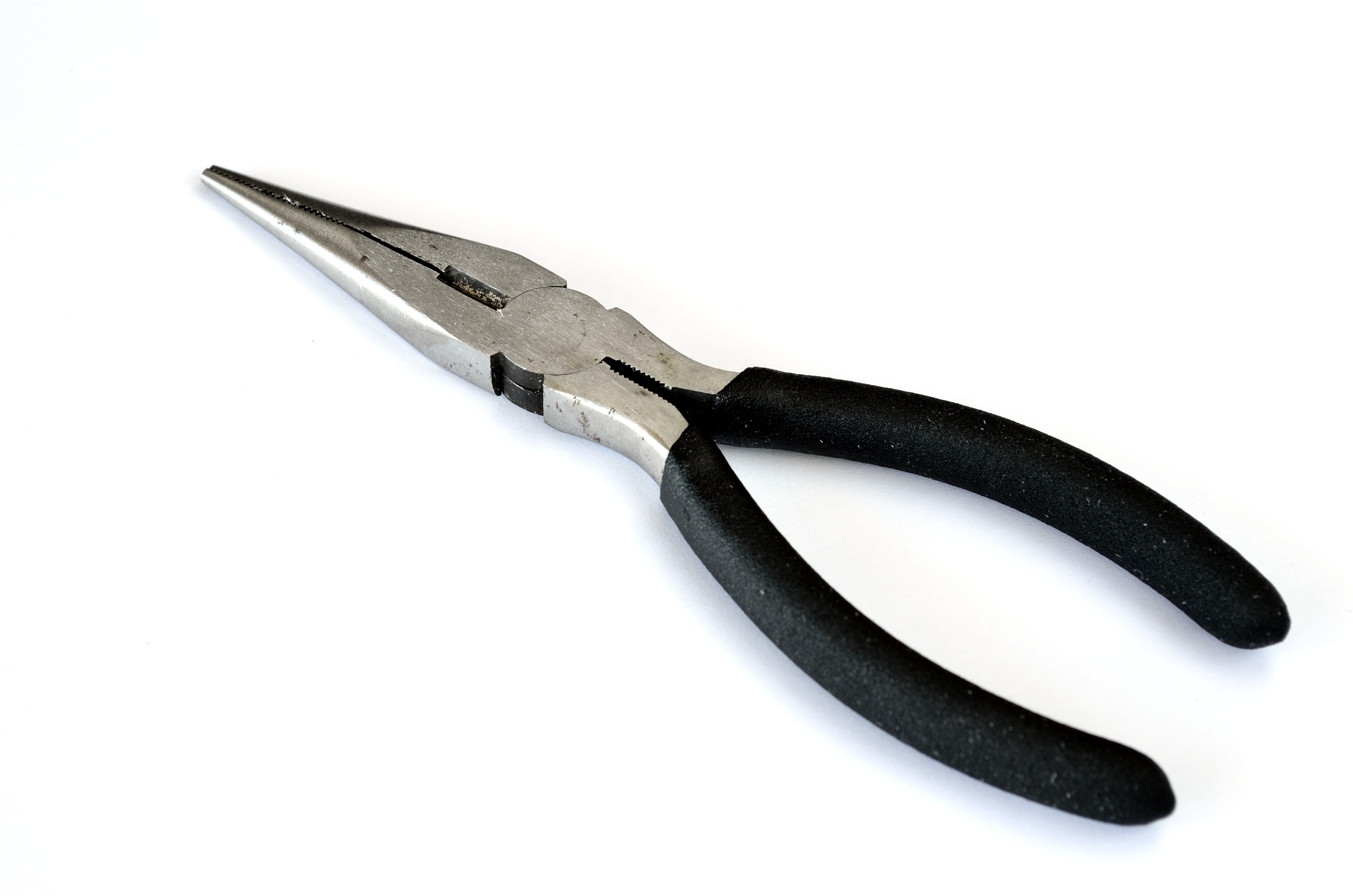
Needle-nose pliers

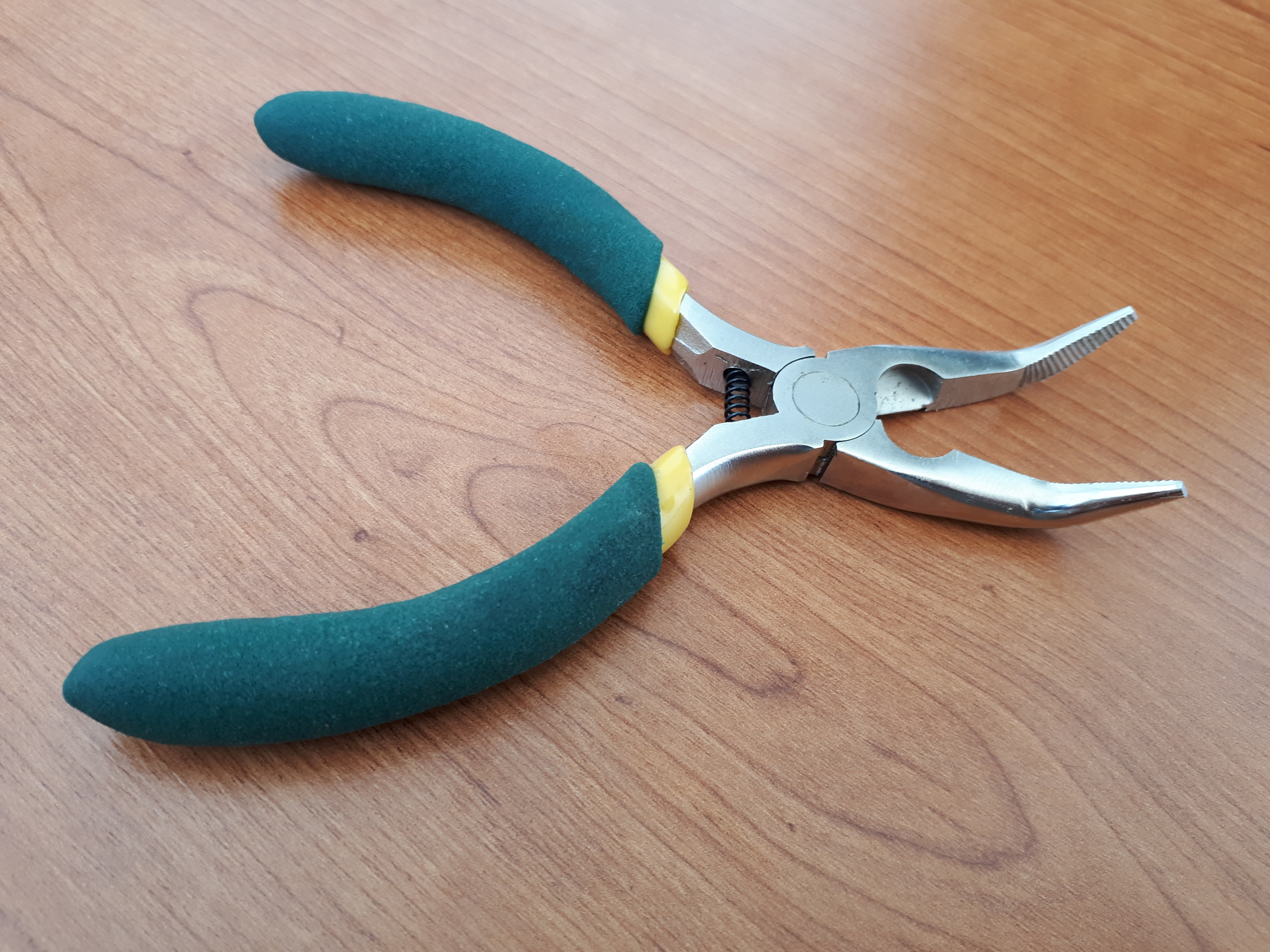
Bent nose pliers

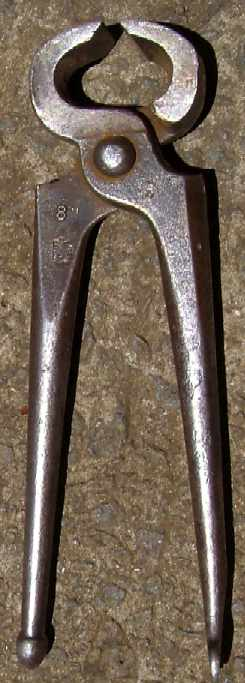
Pincers

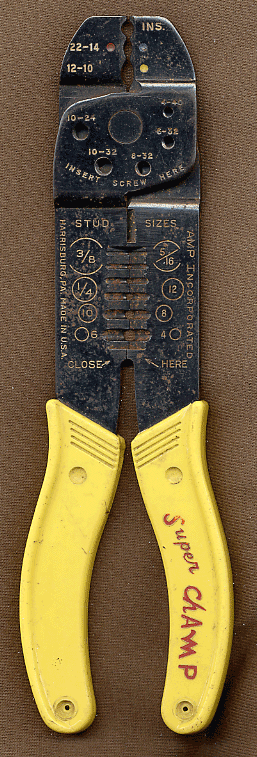
Electrical wire stripping and terminal crimping pliers

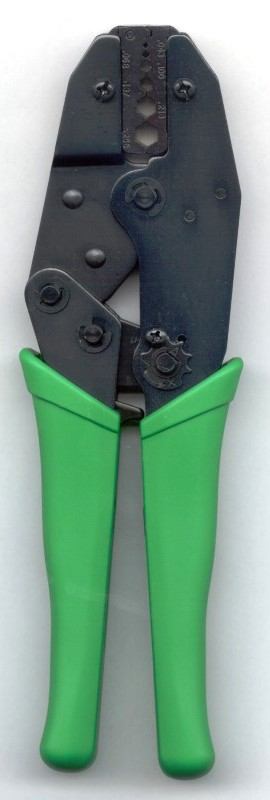
Hand crimp tool for N, R-SMA, TNC connectors for RG174, RG58 and HDF/LMR200

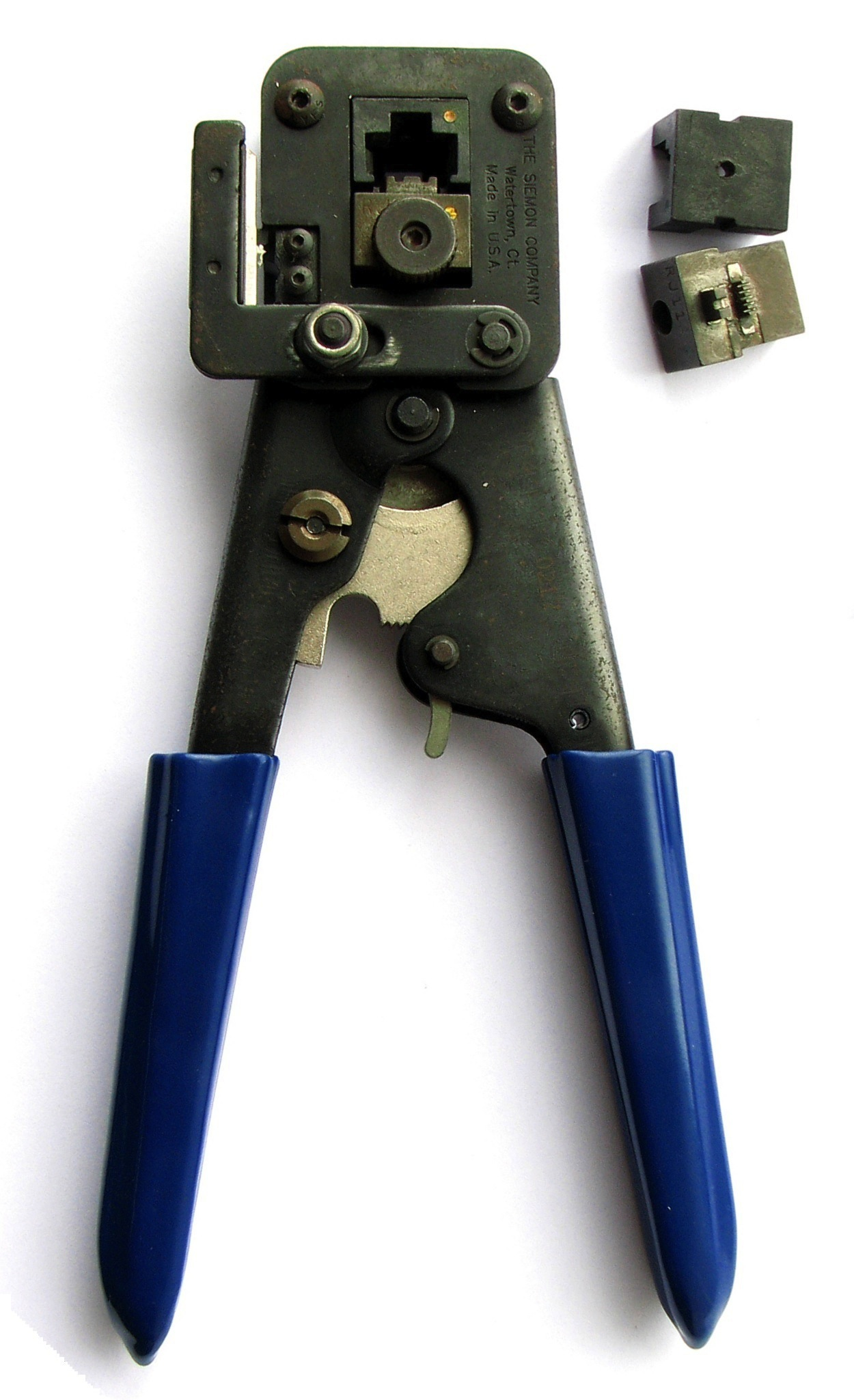
Heavy duty crimping pliers for modular connectors that have interchangeable RJ heads

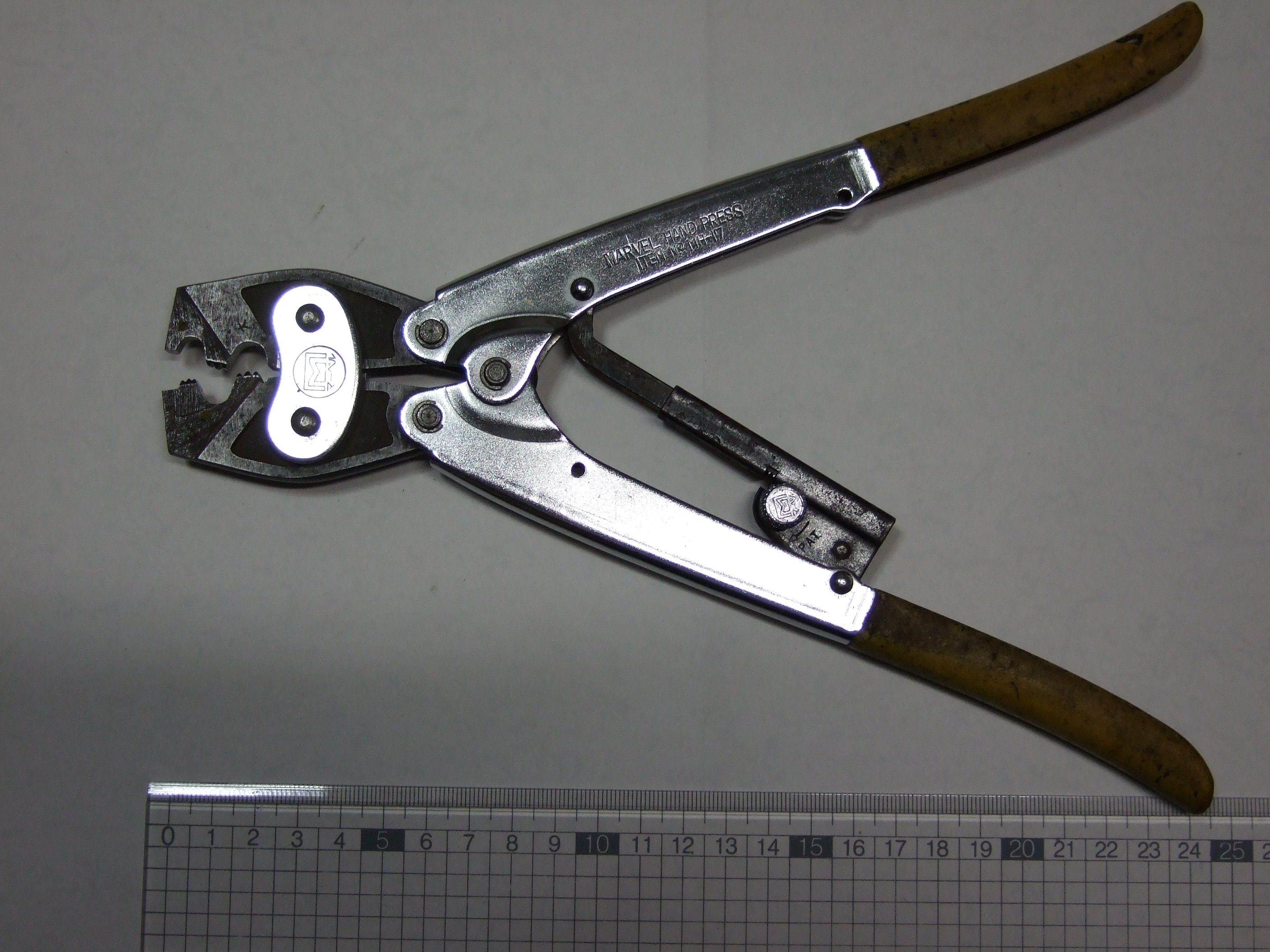
Hand crimp tool

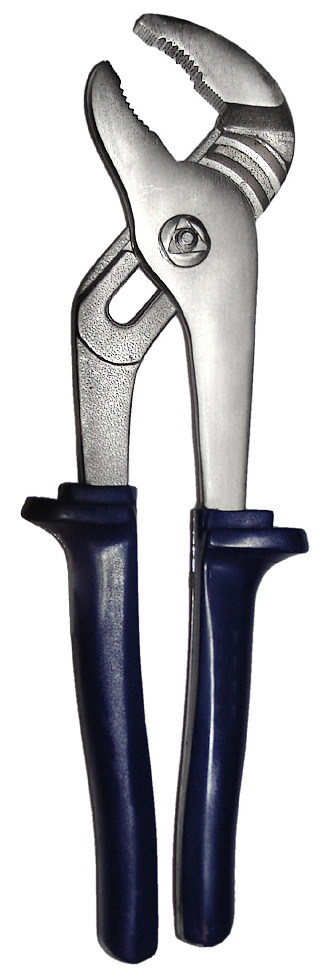
Tongue-and-groove pliers, also known as channel-locks after the Channellock brand

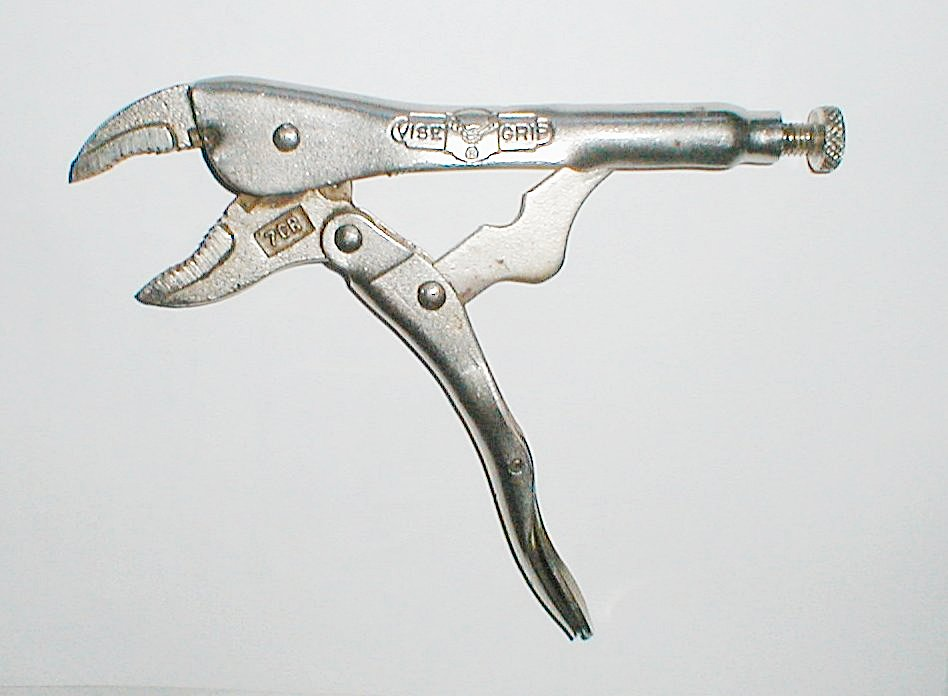
Locking pliers, also known as a vise-grip

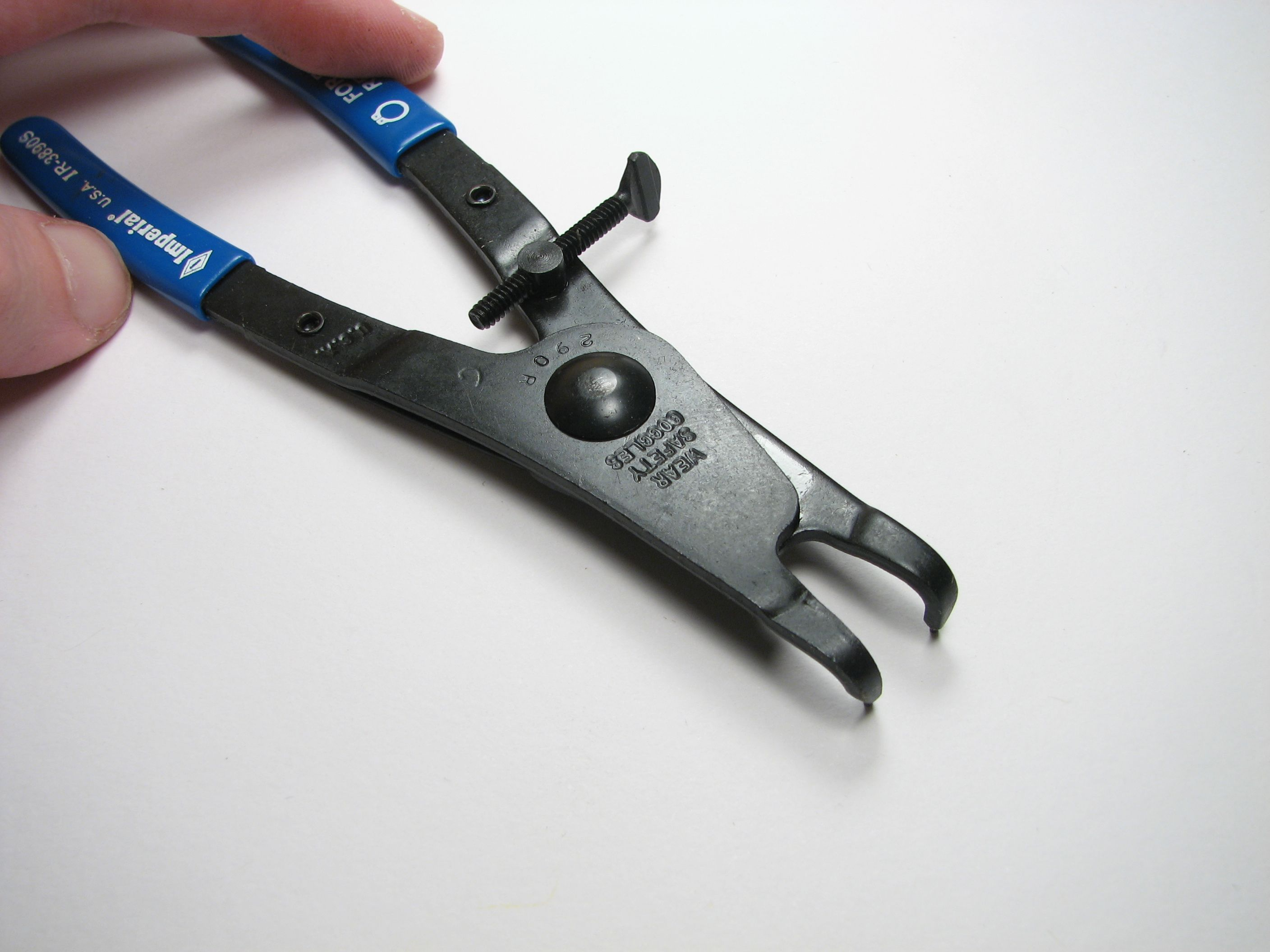
Circlip pliers, for fitting and removing retaining rings

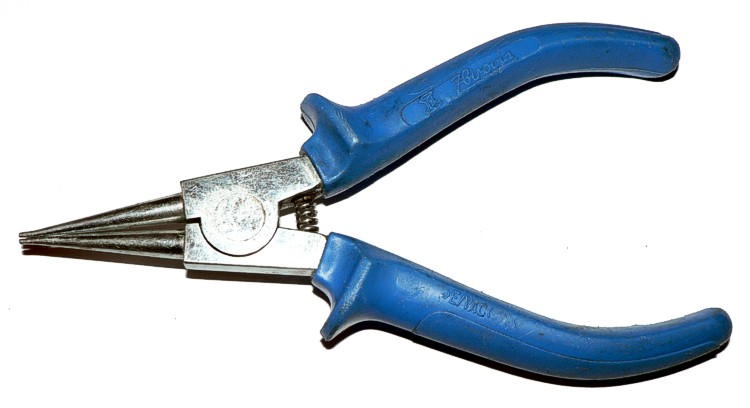
Round-nose pliers, for making loops in wires

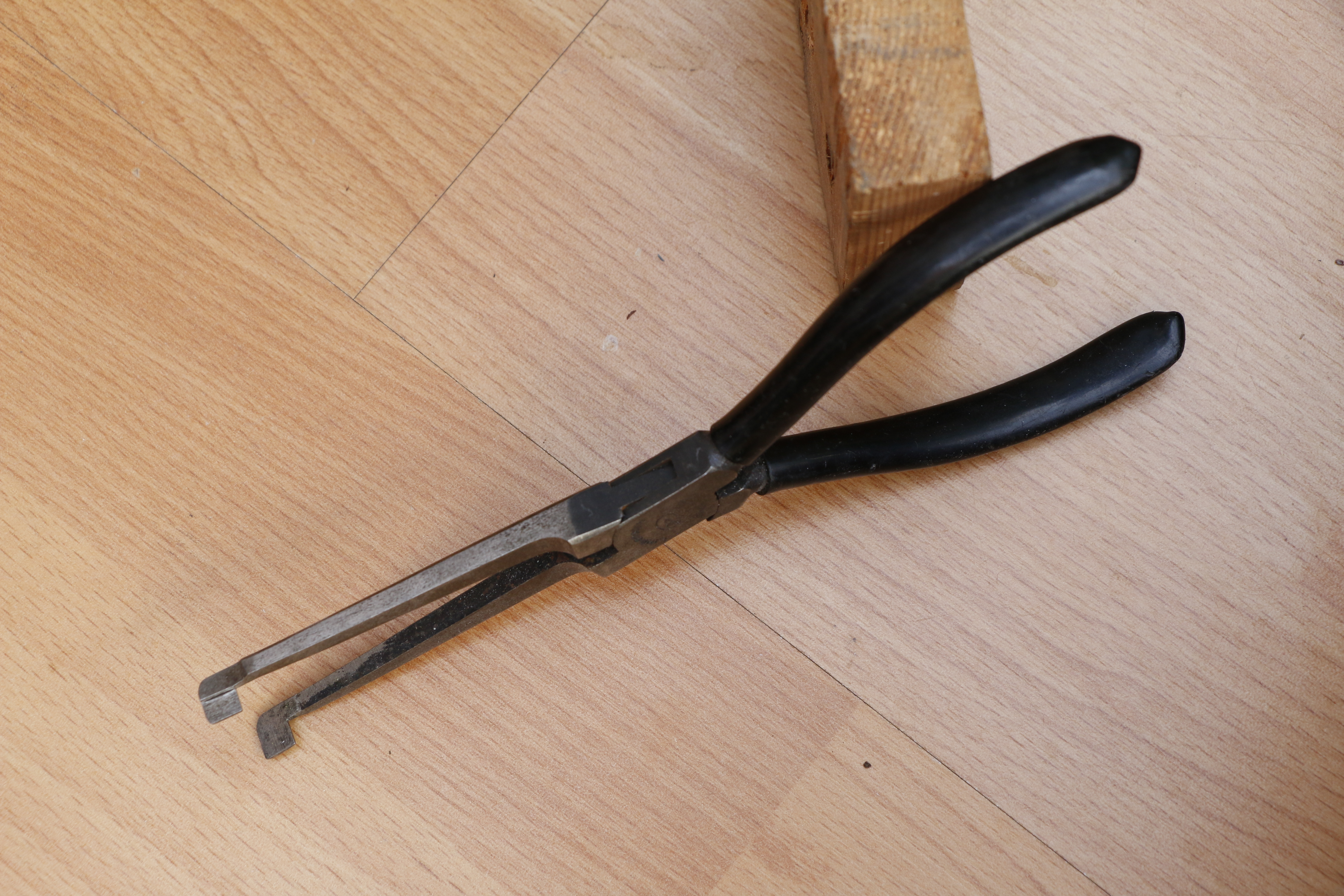
Wiper pliers used to adjust the wipers and spring-sets on electro-mechanical relays.

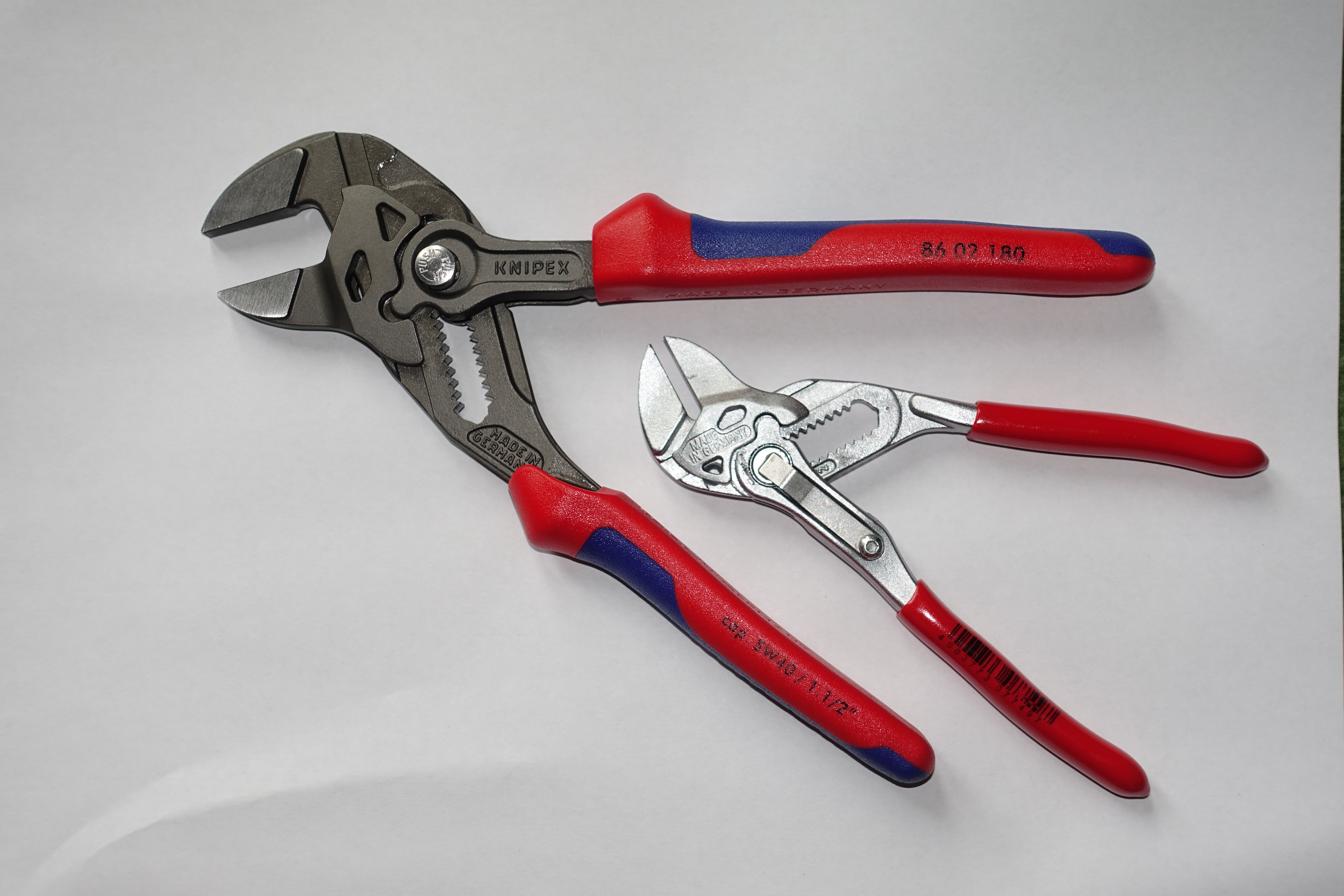
Contemporary 'Pliers Wrench' with high mechanical advantage parallel-gripping jaws.

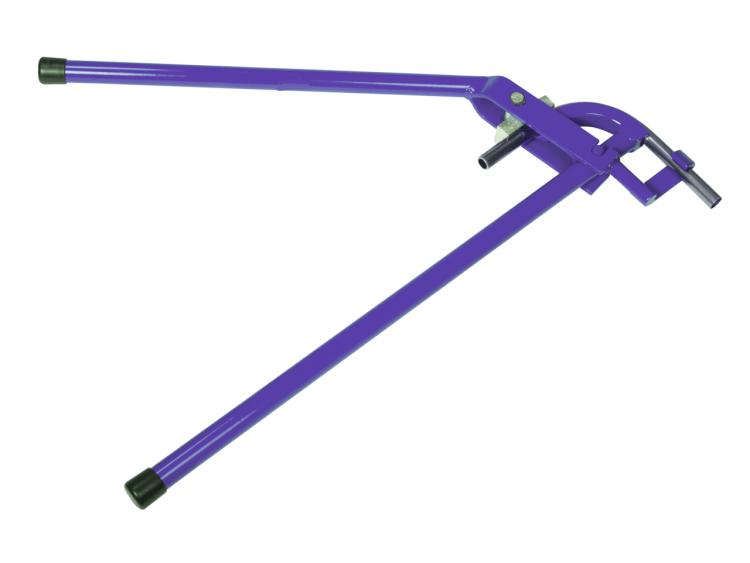
Bending Pliers, for bending pipes.

== See also ==
- Nipper
