= Lineman's pliers =

Hand tool for wire and cable

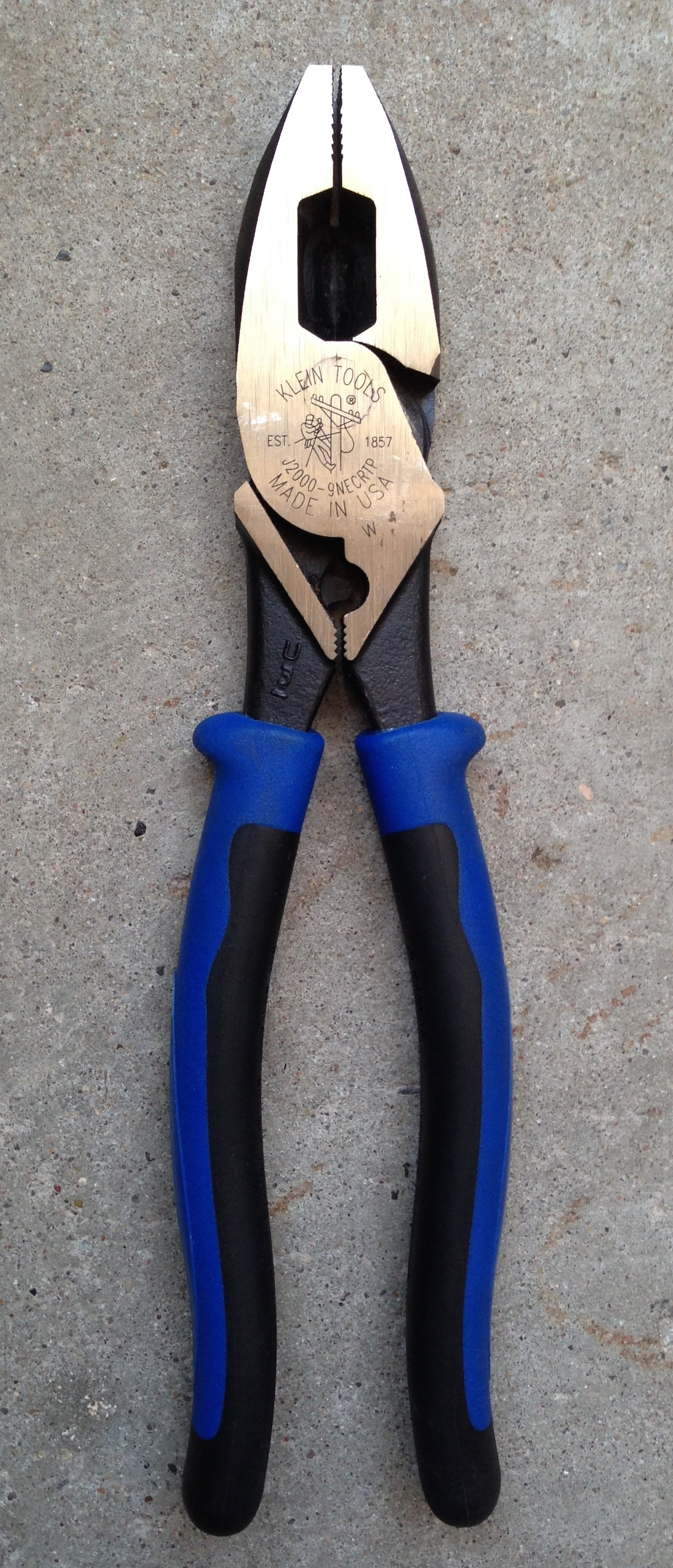
- Lineman's pliers. This pair features, from top to bottom: gripping jaws, wire cutter, notch for pulling fish tape, crimper for different terminal connections, and rubber-coated handles.
- Other names: Kleins, nines
- Classification: Hand tool
- Related: Pliers

Lineman's pliers (American English), Kleins (genericized trademark, primarily North American), linesman pliers (Canadian English), lineman's side-cutting pliers, and combination pliers (British and American English) are a type of multi-functional pliers used by lineworkers, electricians, and other tradesmen primarily for gripping, twisting, bending and cutting wire, cable, and small metalwork components.

Lineman's pliers have stub noses, and angular edges for reaming conduits. Their jaws have two distinct surfaces: ridged flat grips, and bevelled cutting edges (similar to diagonal pliers). They may include additional features such as a concave gripper (for holding rods, pipes, and other rounded objects), a crimper, or wire shears. These pliers often have rubber handles, which may provide a level of insulation to protect against electric shock when working with live circuits.

Lineman's pliers are used in the electrical trade to cut, straighten, and bend wire, or twist wires together when making splices. These pliers can be used to strip wire and some types of cable; wire strippers are preferred as they're less likely to damage the conductor. They can be used to pull fish tape through long runs of conduit where the high friction makes it difficult to pull it by hand.

First appearing in the early 20th century, Matthias Klein & Sons (now Klein Tools) sold the initial variants, and other manufacturers frequently used the term "Klein pattern" to refer to this design.

== See also ==
- Breaker-grozier pliers – a superficially similar tool used in glass cutting.
