= Apprenticeship in the United States =

Apprenticeship programs in the United States are regulated by the Smith–Hughes Act (1917), The National Industrial Recovery Act (1933), and National Apprenticeship Act, also known as the "Fitzgerald Act."

The number of American apprentices has increased from 375,000 in 2014 to 500,000 in 2016, while the federal government intends to see 750,000 by 2019, particularly by expanding the apprenticeship model to include white-collar occupations such as information technology.

== Background ==
An apprenticeship is a system for training a new generation of practitioners of a trade or profession with on-the-job training and often some accompanying study (classroom work and reading). Apprenticeships can also enable practitioners to gain a license to practice in a regulated profession. Most of their training is done while working for an employer who helps the apprentices learn their trade or profession, in exchange for their continued labour for an agreed period after they have achieved measurable competencies.

== Educational regime ==
See also standards based education reform which eliminates different standards for vocational or academic tracks

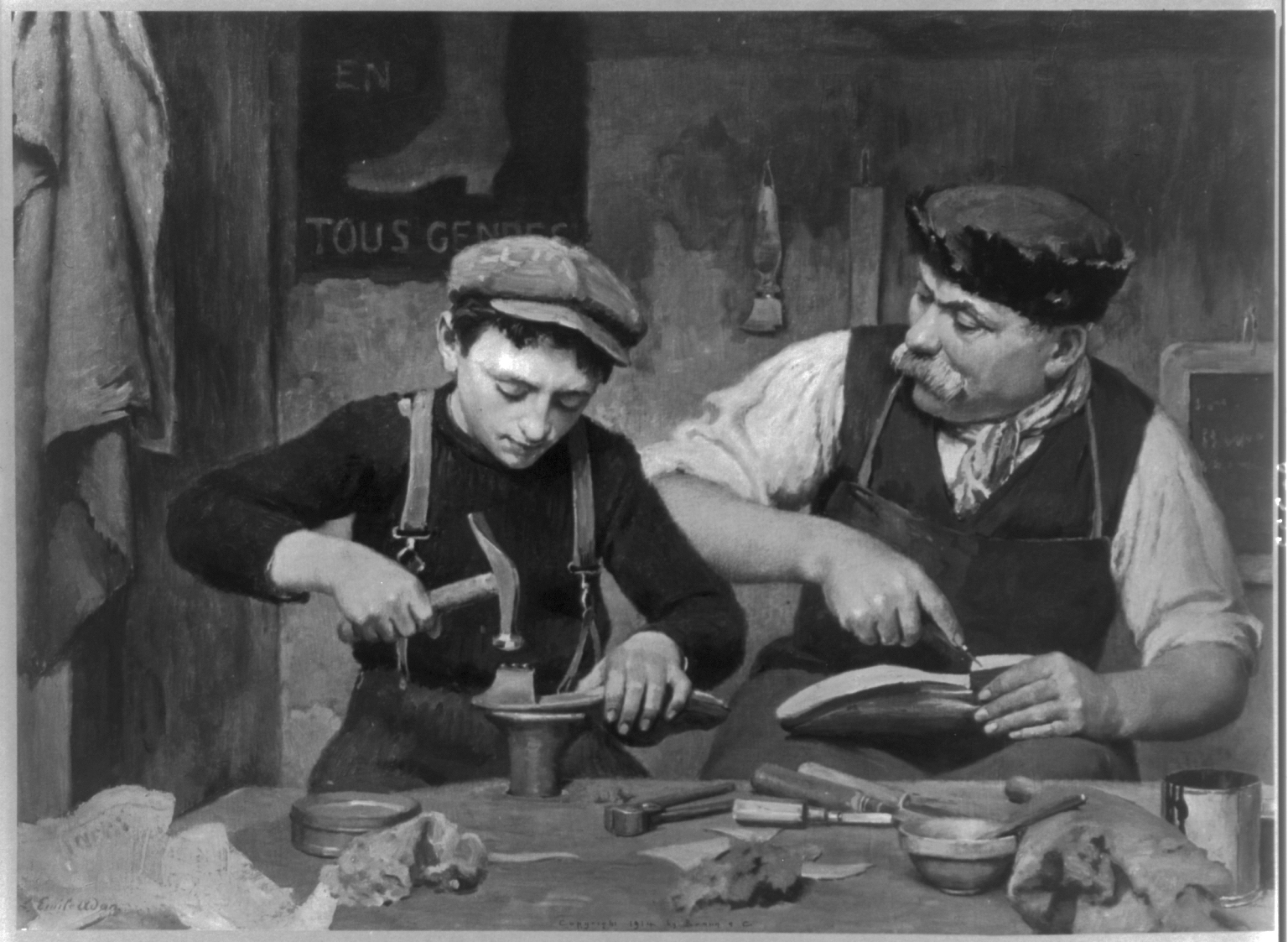
A shoe repairman and his young apprentice

In the United States, education officials and nonprofit organizations who seek to emulate the apprenticeship system in other nations have created school to work education reforms. They seek to link academic education to careers. Some programs include job shadowing, watching a real worker for a short period of time, or actually spending significant time at a job at no or reduced pay that would otherwise be spent in academic classes or working at a local business. Some legislators raised the issue of child labor laws for unpaid labor or jobs with hazards.

In the United States, school to work programs usually occur only in high school. American high schools were introduced in the early 20th century to educate students of all ability and interests in one learning community rather than prepare a small number for college. Traditionally, American students are tracked within a wide choice of courses based on ability, with vocational courses (such as auto repair and carpentry) tending to be at the lower end of academic ability and trigonometry and pre-calculus at the upper end.

American education reformers have sought to end such tracking, which is seen as a barrier to opportunity. By contrast, the system studied by the NCEE (National Center on Education and the Economy) actually relies much more heavily on tracking. Education officials in the U.S., based largely on school redesign proposals by NCEE and other organizations, have chosen to use criterion-referenced tests that define one high standard that must be achieved by all students to receive a uniform diploma. American education policy under the "No Child Left Behind Act" has as an official goal the elimination of the achievement gap between populations. This has often led to the need for remedial classes in college.

Many U.S. states now require passing a high school graduation examination to ensure that students across all ethnic, gender and income groups possess the same skills. In states such as Washington, critics have questioned whether this ensures success for all or just creates massive failure (as only half of all 10th graders have demonstrated they can meet the standards).

The construction industry is perhaps the heaviest user of apprenticeship programs in the United States, with the US Department of Labor reporting 74,164 new apprentices accepted in 2007 at the height of the construction boom. Most of these apprentices participated in what are called "joint" apprenticeship programs, administered jointly by construction employers and construction labor unions. For example, the International Union of Painters and Allied Trades (IUPAT) has opened the Finishing Trades Institute (FTI). The FTI is working towards national accreditation so that it may offer associate and bachelor's degrees that integrate academics with a more traditional apprentice programs. The IUPAT has joined forces with the Professional Decorative Painters Association (PDPA) to build educational standards using a model of apprenticeship created by the PDPA.

== Examples of programs ==
Apprenticeship offices in the United States

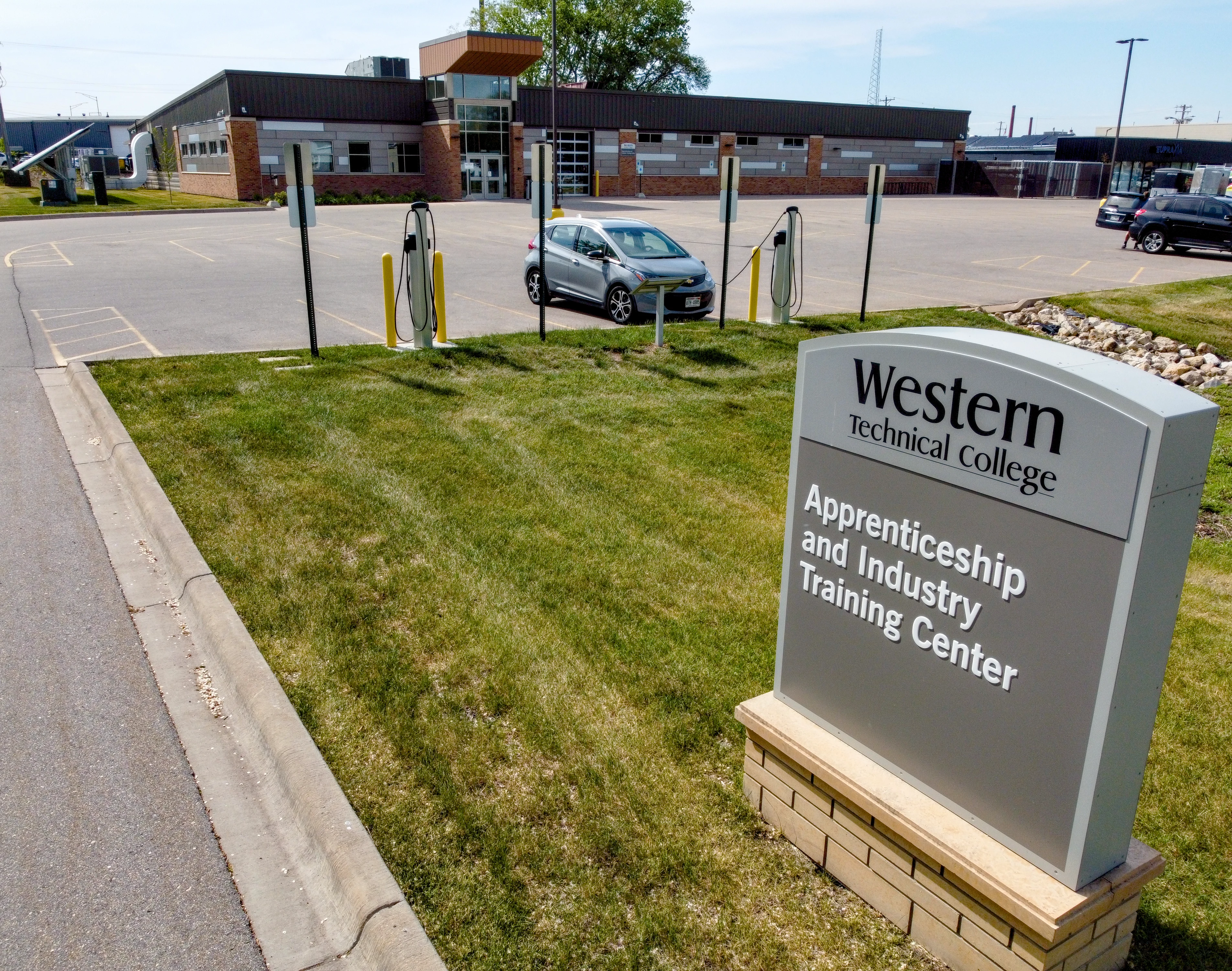
Western Technical College apprenticeship center

Persons interested in learning to become electricians can join one of several apprenticeship programs offered jointly by the International Brotherhood of Electrical Workers and the National Electrical Contractors Association. No background in electrical work is required. A minimum age of 18 is required. There is no maximum age. Men and women are equally invited to participate. The organization in charge of the program is called the National Joint Apprenticeship and Training Committee

Apprentice electricians work 32 to 40+ hours per week at the trade under the supervision of a journeyman wireman and receive pay and benefits. They spend an additional 8 hours every other week in classroom training. At the conclusion of training (five years for inside wireman and outside lineman, less for telecommunications), apprentices reach the level of journeyman wireman. All of this is offered at no charge, except for the cost of books (which is approximately $200–600 per year), depending on grades. Persons completing this program are considered highly skilled by employers and command high pay and benefits. Other unions such as the United Brotherhood of Carpenters and Joiners of America, United Association of Plumbers, Fitters, Welders and HVAC Service Techs, Operating Engineers, Ironworkers, Sheet Metal Workers, Plasterers, Bricklayers and others offer similar programs.

Trade associations such as the Independent Electrical Contractors and Associated Builders and Contractors also offer a variety of apprentice training programs. 12 registered programs also are offered by AJAC to fill a shortage of aerospace and advanced manufacturing workers in Washington State, including occupations such as machinist, tool and die maker, industrial maintenance technician and registered Youth Apprenticeships.

For FDA-regulated industries such as food, pharmaceuticals, medical devices, nutraceuticals and cosemecuticals, companies may offer apprenticeships in Quality Assurance, Quality Control, Medical Affairs (MSLs), Clinical Trials, or Regulatory Affairs. Apprentices may be placed at a host company and must continue to work toward an industry certification such as those offered by ASQ or RAPS while they remain in the apprenticeship. The costs of training and mentorship can be covered by the program and apprentices receive full pay and benefits.

=== Example of a professional apprenticeship ===
A modified form of apprenticeship is required for before an engineer is licensed as a Professional Engineer in the United States. In the United States, each of the 50 states sets its own licensing requirements and issues licenses to those who wish to practice engineering in that state.

Although the requirements can vary slightly from state to state, in general to obtain a Professional Engineering License, one must graduate with Bachelor of Science in Engineering from an accredited college or university, pass the Fundamentals of Engineering (FE) Exam, which designates the title of Engineer in Training (EIT), work in that discipline for at least four years under a licensed Professional Engineer (PE), and then pass the Principles and Practice of Engineering Exam. One and two years of experience credit is given for those with qualifying master’s and doctoral degrees, respectively.

In most cases the states have reciprocity agreements so that once an individual becomes licensed in one state can also become licensed in other states with relative ease.

=== Apprenticeship degree ===
An apprenticeship degree is a U.S. postsecondary system that integrates on-the-job training with an accredited academic degree. In the United States, apprenticeship degrees are being offered at some community colleges and universities.

=== Youth Apprenticeship ===
Youth Apprenticeship is promising new strategy to engage youth in career connected learning, encourage high school completion, lower the youth unemployment rate, lower the skills gap and to provide a pipeline for youth into higher education or into industry as qualified workers to fill open positions.

These programs provide high school sophomores, juniors, and seniors with a career and educational pathway into industry. They develop real-world skills, earn competitive wages, and gain high school credits towards graduation and receive tuition free college credits. Upon completion of the program, the youth apprentices will obtain a journey level certification from the State Department of Labor and Industries, a nationally recognized credential.

Youth apprenticeship has been successfully piloted in a number of states including, Washington, Wisconsin, Colorado, Oregon, North Carolina and South Carolina. In these states, thousands of high school students engage in both classroom technical training and paid structured on-the-job training across a number of high-growth, high-demand industries. In Charlotte, NC several companies, many rooted in Europe, have started joint programs (Apprenticeship Charlotte and Apprenticeship 2000) to jointly further the idea of apprenticeships and close the gap in technical workforce availability. In Washington State, the AJAC has partnered with nearly 50 aerospace and advanced manufacturing companies to offer registered Youth Apprenticeships in partnership with the Washington State Department of Labor & Industries.

=== Re-entry Apprenticeship ===
Apprenticeship programs for individuals who have been previously incarcerated aim to decrease recidivism and increase re-entry employment. The Post-Release Employment Project cross analyzed data of inmates who utilized re-entry apprenticeship programs amongst those who did not. It has been found that post-prison programs increase an ex-inmate's likelihood to retain employment. Participation in work and job skill programs decreased an inmates likelihood of being recommitted by 8 to 12 years. The three main types of re-entry apprenticeship programs are: "jobs in the prison setting, short term vocation training in prison, and short term assistance in the job search process upon release." Research done by Uggan in 2000, concluded that these programs have the greatest effects on individuals older than 26 years old. Andrews et al., highlights the importance of catering prison programs to the needs of a specific offender. Not everyone will benefit equally from these programs and this form of training has found to only be beneficial to for those who are ready to exit crime. An example of a re-entry apprenticeship program is Job Corps. Job Corps is a residential program centered around work, providing a structured community for at-risk teens. In 2000, an experiment done by Schochet et al., found that those who were not enrolled in the program were had an arrest rate 15.9% higher than those who were enrolled in the program.

In Washington State, incarcerated individuals at the Washington Corrections Center for Women in Gig Harbor can participate in a registered pre-apprenticeship program offered by AJAC, a nonprofit founded to increase skills for careers in manufacturing. Graduates of the program can go on to work in aerospace, food processing and other industries.

=== White-Collar Apprenticeships ===
The U.S. Department of Labor has identified a model that has been successful in Europe and transferred it to American corporations, the model of white-collar apprenticeship programs. These programs are similar to other, more traditional blue-collar apprenticeship programs as they both consist of on-the-job training as the U.S. Department of Labor has implemented a path for the middle class in America to learn the necessary skills in a proven training program that employers in industries such as information technology, insurance, and health care. Through the adoption of these new white-collar apprenticeship programs, individuals are able to receive specialized training that they may have previously never been able to gain access to and, in some cases, also receive their Associate's Degree in a related field of study, sponsored by the company they are working for. The desire for more apprenticeship programs and more apprenticeship training has been in bipartisan agreement, and the agreement and push for more individuals to join these programs has seen dividends for active enrollment. The Labor Department has seen an increase in the amount of active apprentices, with the number rising from 375,000 in 2013 all the way to 633,625 active apprentices in 2019; however, a majority of these active apprentices are still in areas of skilled trades, such as plumbing or electrical work, there has been a rise of over 700 new white-collar apprenticeship programs from 2017 to 2019. The corporate support that these white-collar apprenticeship programs are receiving are from some of the world's largest organizations such as Amazon, CVS Health, Accenture, Aon, and many others.

== Construction Apprenticeship Agreement Cancellations by Trade ==
Percent of Construction Apprenticeship Agreements Cancelled by Trade
10%	20%	30%	40%	50%	60%	70%
(New Apprentices Federally Registered between 2006 and 2007)
Elevator Installers & Repairers; 23%						
Sheet Metal Workers; 32%						
Operating Engineers and other Const. Equip. Operators; 32%						
Insulations Workers; 37%						
Boilermakers; 39%						
Glaziers; 41%						
Structural Iron & Steel Workers; 43%						
Electricians; 43%						
Plumbers, Pipefitters & Steamfitters; 44%						
Floor Layers; 47%						
Drywall and Ceiling Tile Installers; 48%						
Cement Masons, Concrete Finishers & Terrazo Workers; 49%						
Laborers; 50%						
Carpenters; 53%						
Reinforcing Iron & Rebar Workers; 55%						
Brickmasons, Blockmasons, & Stonemasons; 56%						
Painters; 59%						
Roofers; 64%						

== See also ==
- National Apprenticeship Act
- Praxis
- Registered Apprenticeship
- Apprenticeship degree
- Indentured servitude in British America
- Commercial Advancement Training Scheme
- RR Donnelley
- National Joint Apprenticeship and Training Committee
- Native American Composers Apprenticeship Project
- Hire-Train-Deploy (HTD)
