= Edwin Hill =

Edwin Hill may refer to:

- Edwin Hill (engineer) (1793–1876), British inventor (of envelope manufacturing machine), Controller of Stamps
- Edwin Hill-Trevor, 1st Baron Trevor (1819–1894), styled as Lord Edwin Hill until 1862
- Edwin A. Hill (active 1900), American inventor of the Hill system for writing chemical formulae
- Edwin J. Hill (1894–1941), U.S. Navy sailor posthumously awarded the Medal of Honor
- Edwin D. Hill (1937–2018), American president of the International Brotherhood of Electrical Workers
- Edwin Escobar Hill (born 1969), Guatemalan politician
- Edwin C. Hill (1884 or 1885–1957), American newspaper reporter

== See also ==
- Ed Hill (disambiguation)
- Edwin St Hill (1904–1957), Trinidadian cricketer
- Hill (surname)
