= Jack Barry (unionist) =

John Joseph "Jack" Barry (May 19, 1924 – August 28, 2005) was an American labor union leader.

Born in Syracuse, New York, Barry became an electrician and joined the International Brotherhood of Electrical Workers (IBEW) in 1943. Later that year, he joined the United States Navy and served in World War II. After the war, he returned to working as an electrician, and was elected as business manager of his union local in 1962.

In 1968, Barry became an international representative for the union, and in 1976, he was elected as a vice-president. He was elected as president of IBEW in 1986, and in 1987 was additionally elected as a vice-president of the AFL-CIO. He was re-elected as leader of the union in 1991 and again in 1996, retiring in 2001. During his time in office, the union lost members as electrical utility industry was deregulated, but Barry was able to increase membership in the construction industry. He was appointed by Bill Clinton to the Competitiveness Policy Council and the President's Export Council.

Barry died in 2005 of asbestosis, contracted through his job.

Trade union offices
Preceded by Charles H. Pillard	President of the International Brotherhood of Electrical Workers; 1986–2001	Succeeded by Edwin D. Hill
