= Ed Hill (disambiguation) =

Ed Hill may refer to:

- Eddie Hill (born 1936), American drag racer
- Edwin D. Hill (Edwin D. "Ed" Hill, 1937–2018), American electrical worker, labor union activist and labor leader
- Ed Hill (active 1970 and after), American country music songwriter
- Ed Hill (comedian) (born 1984), Taiwanese-Canadian stand-up comedian and podcaster
- E. D. Hill (born 1962), American journalist and news presenter

== See also ==
- Edward Hill (disambiguation)
- Ted Hill (disambiguation)
- Hill (surname)
- All pages with titles containing "Ed Hill"
