= Electrician =

Tradesperson specializing in electrical wiring

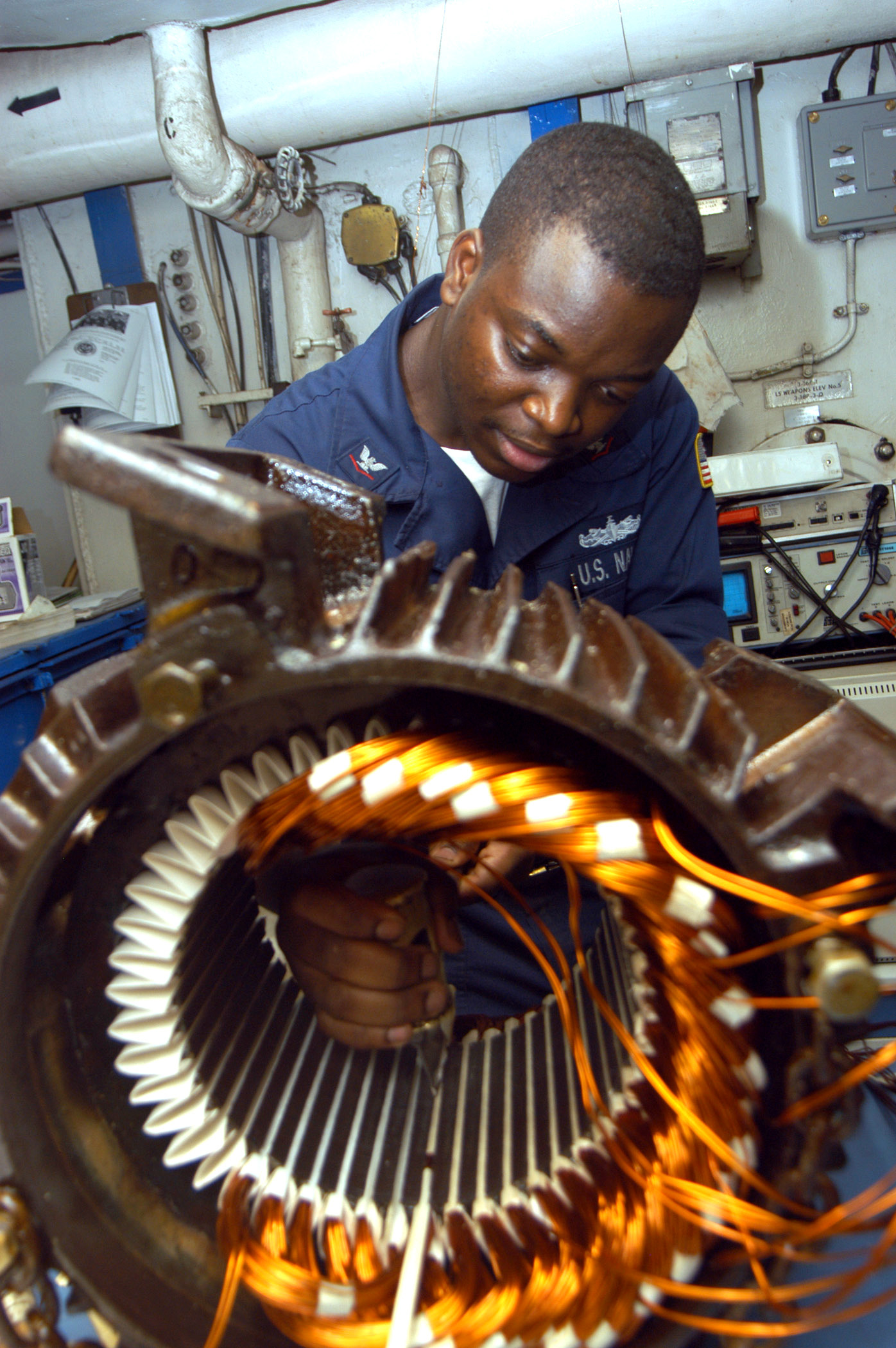
- A US Navy electrician's mate rewiring the stator of an induction motor.

Occupation
- Occupation type: Vocational
- Activity sectors: Maintenance, Electrical Grid

Description
- Education required: Apprenticeship
- Fields of employment: Construction
- Related jobs: Lineperson

An electrician is a tradesperson specializing in electrical wiring of buildings, transmission lines, stationary machines, and related equipment. Electricians may be employed in the installation of new electrical components or the maintenance and repair of existing electrical infrastructure. Electricians may also specialize in wiring ships, airplanes, and other mobile platforms, as well as data and cable lines.

== Terminology ==
Electricians were originally people who demonstrated or studied the principles of electricity, often electrostatic generators of one form or another.

In the United States, electricians are divided into two primary categories: lineperson, who work on electric utility company distribution systems at higher voltages, and wiremen, who work with the lower voltages utilized inside buildings. Wiremen are generally trained in one of five primary specialties: commercial, residential, light industrial, industrial, and low-voltage wiring, more commonly known as Voice-Data-Video, or VDV. Other sub-specialties such as control wiring and fire-alarm may be performed by specialists trained in the devices being installed, or by inside wiremen.

Electricians are trained to one of three levels: Apprentice, Journeyperson, and Master Electrician. In the US and Canada, apprentices work and receive a reduced compensation while learning their trade. They generally take several hundred hours of classroom instruction and are contracted to follow apprenticeship standards for a period of between three and six years, during which time they are paid as a percentage of the Journeyperson's pay. Journeymen are electricians who have completed their Apprenticeship and who have been found by the local, State, or National licensing body to be competent in the electrical trade. Master Electricians have performed well in the trade for a period of time, often seven to ten years, and have passed an exam to demonstrate superior knowledge of the National Electrical Code, or NEC.

Service electricians are tasked to respond to requests for isolated repairs and upgrades. They have skills troubleshooting wiring problems, installing wiring in existing buildings, and making repairs. Construction electricians primarily focus on larger projects, such as installing all new electrical system for an entire building, or upgrading an entire floor of an office building as part of a remodeling process. Other specialty areas are marine electricians, research electricians and hospital electricians. "Electrician" is also used as the name of a role in stagecraft, where electricians are tasked primarily with hanging, focusing, and operating stage lighting. In this context, the Master Electrician is the show's chief electrician. Although theater electricians routinely perform electrical work on stage lighting instruments and equipment, they are not part of the electrical trade and have a different set of skills and qualifications from the electricians that work on building wiring.

In the film industry and on a television crew the head electrician is referred to as a Gaffer.

Electrical contractors are businesses that employ electricians to design, install, and maintain electrical systems. Contractors are responsible for generating bids for new jobs, hiring tradespeople for the job, providing material to electricians in a timely manner, and communicating with architects, electrical and building engineers, and the customer to plan and complete the finished product.

In British English, an electrician is colloquially known as a spark or a sparky.

== Training and regulation of trade ==
Electrician installing new meter socket on the side of a house.

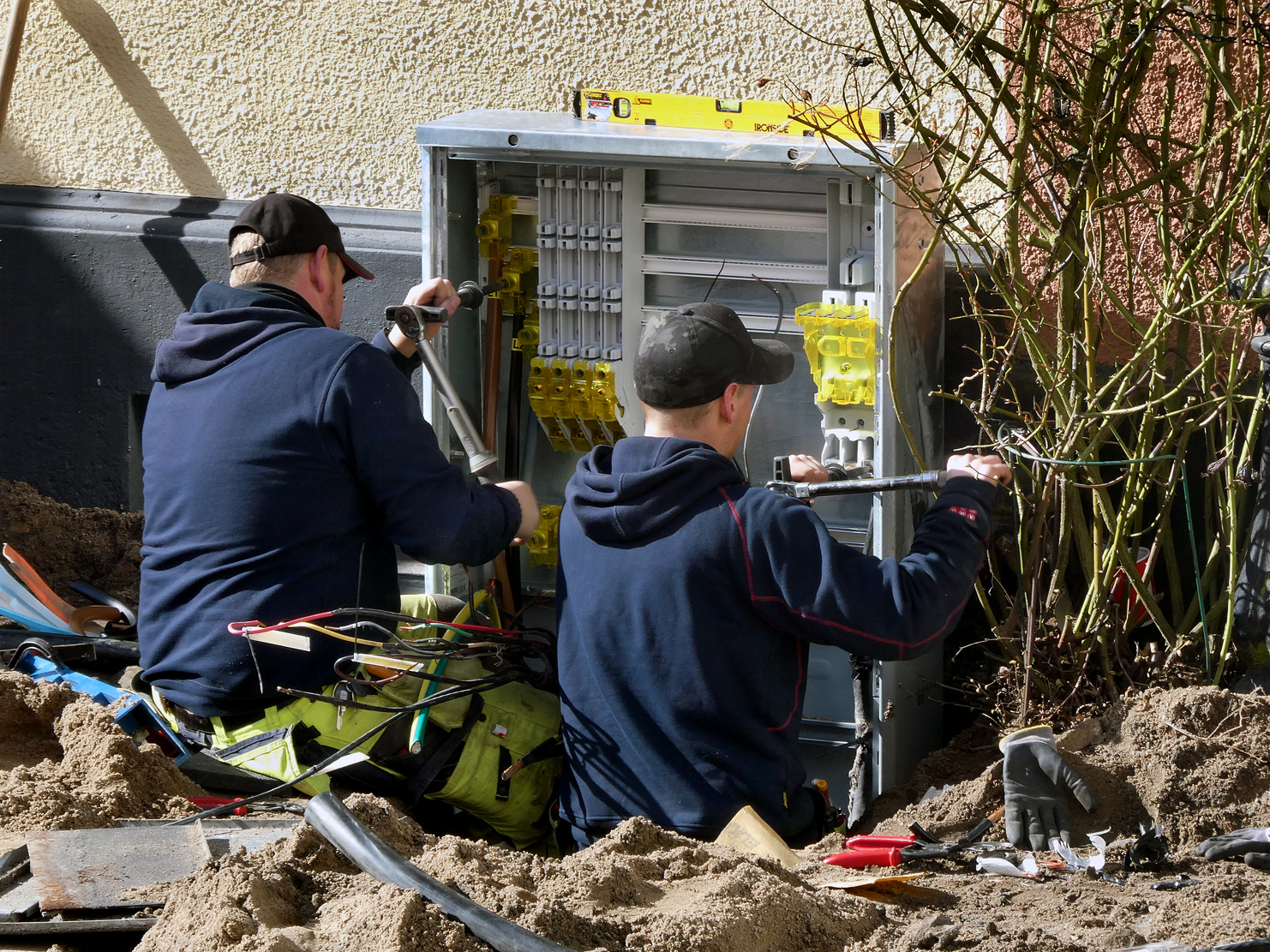
Two electricians install high-current cabinet in Ystad 2021.

Many jurisdictions have regulatory restrictions concerning electrical work for safety reasons due to the many hazards of working with electricity. Such requirements may be testing, registration or licensing. Licensing requirements vary between jurisdictions.

=== Australia ===
An electrician's license entitles the holder to carry out all types of electrical installation work in Australia without supervision. However, to contract, or offer to contract, to carry out electrical installation work, a licensed electrician must also be registered as an electrical contractor. Under Australian law, electrical work that involves fixed wiring is strictly regulated and must almost always be performed by a licensed electrician or electrical contractor. A local electrician can handle a range of work including air conditioning, light fittings and installation, safety switches, smoke alarm installation, inspection and certification and testing and tagging of electrical appliances.

To provide data, structured cabling systems, home automation & theatre, LAN, WAN and VPN data solutions or phone points, an installer must be licensed as a Telecommunications Cable Provider under a scheme controlled by Australian Communications and Media Authority

Electrical licensing in Australia is regulated by the individual states. In Western Australia, the Department of Commerce tracks licensee's and allows the public to search for individually named/licensed Electricians.

Currently in Victoria the apprenticeship lasts for four years, during three of those years the apprentice attends trade school in either a block release of one week each month or one day each week. At the end of the apprenticeship the apprentice is required to pass three examinations, one of which is theory based with the other two practically based. Upon successful completion of these exams, providing all other components of the apprenticeship are satisfactory, the apprentice is granted an A Class licence on application to Energy Safe Victoria (ESV).

An A Class electrician may perform work unsupervised but is unable to work for profit or gain without having the further qualifications necessary to become a Registered Electrical Contractor (REC) or being in the employment of a person holding REC status. However, some exemptions do exist.

In most cases a certificate of electrical safety must be submitted to the relevant body after any electrical works are performed.

Safety equipment used and worn by electricians in Australia (including insulated rubber gloves and mats) needs to be tested regularly to ensure it is still protecting the worker. Because of the high risk involved in this trade, this testing needs to be performed regularly and regulations vary according to state. Industry best practice is the Queensland Electrical Safety Act 2002, and requires six-monthly testing.

=== Canada ===
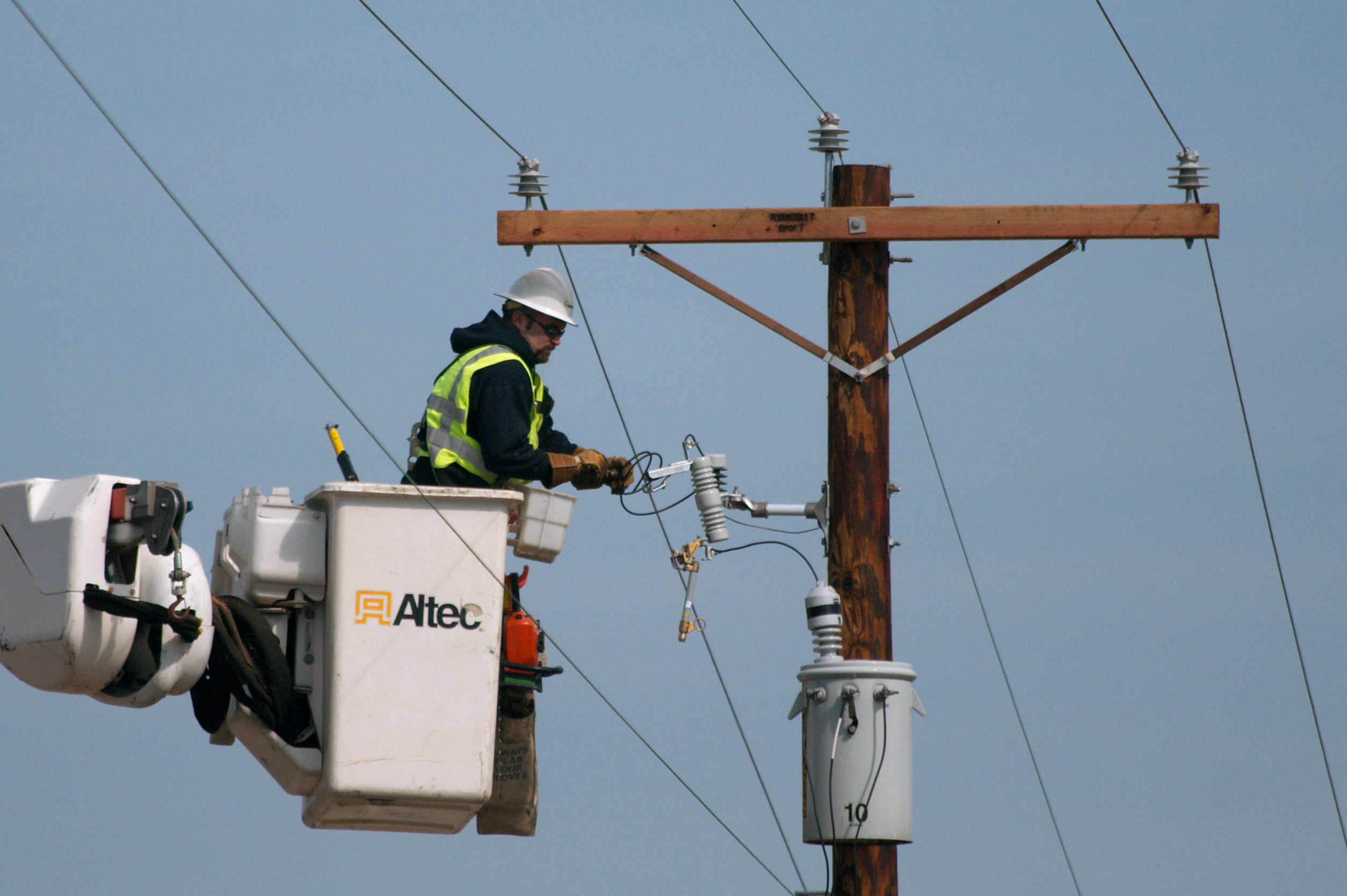
A utility electrician/lineperson does maintenance on a utility pole.

Training of electricians follows an apprenticeship model, taking four or five years to progress to fully qualified journeyperson level. Typical apprenticeship programs consists of 80-90% hands-on work under the supervision of journeymen and 10-20% classroom training. Training and licensing of electricians is regulated by each province, however professional licenses are valid throughout Canada under Agreement on Internal Trade. An endorsement under the Red Seal Program provides additional competency assurance to industry standards. In order for individuals to become a licensed electricians, they need to have 9000 hours of practical, on the job training. They also need to attend school for 4 terms and pass a provincial exam. This training enables them to become journeyperson electricians. Furthermore, in British Columbia, an individual can go a step beyond that and become a "FSR", or field safety representative. This credential gives the ability to become a licensed electrical contractor and to pull permits. Notwithstanding this, some Canadian provinces only grant "permit pulling privileges" to current Master Electricians, that is, a journeyperson who has been engaged in the industry for three years and has passed the Master's examination (i.e. Alberta). The various levels of field safety representatives are A, B and C. The only difference between each class is that they are able to do increasingly higher voltage and current work.

=== United Kingdom ===
The two qualification awarding organisations are City and Guilds and EAL. Electrical competence is required at Level 3 to practice as a 'qualified electrician' in the UK. Once qualified and demonstrating the required level of competence an Electrician can apply to register for a Joint Industry Board Electrotechnical Certification Scheme card in order to work on building sites or other controlled areas.

Although partly covered during Level 3 training, more in depth knowledge and qualifications can be obtained covering subjects such as Design and Verification or Testing and Inspection among others. These additional qualifications can be listed on the reverse of the JIB card. Beyond this level is additional training and qualifications such as EV charger installations or training and working in specialist areas such as street furniture or within industry.

The Electricity at Work Regulations are a statutory document that covers the use and proper maintenance of electrical equipment and installations within businesses and other organisations such as charities. Parts of the Building Regulations cover the legal requirements of the installation of electrical technical equipment with Part P outlining most of the regulations covering dwellings

Information regarding design, selection, installation and testing of electrical structures is provided in the non-statutory publication 'Requirements for Electrical Installations, IET Wiring Regulations, Eighteenth Edition, BS 7671:2018' otherwise known as the Wiring Regulations or 'Regs'. Usual amendments are published on an ad hoc bases when minor changes occur. The first major update of the 18th Edition were published during February 2020 mainly covering the section covering Electric vehicles charger installations although an addendum was published during December 2019 correcting some minor mistakes and adding some small changes. The IET also publish a series of 'Guidance Notes' in book form that provide further in-depth knowledge.

With the exception of the work covered by Part P of the Building Regulations, such as installing consumer units, new circuits or work in bathrooms, there are no laws that prevent anyone from carrying out some basic electrical work in the UK.

=== United States ===
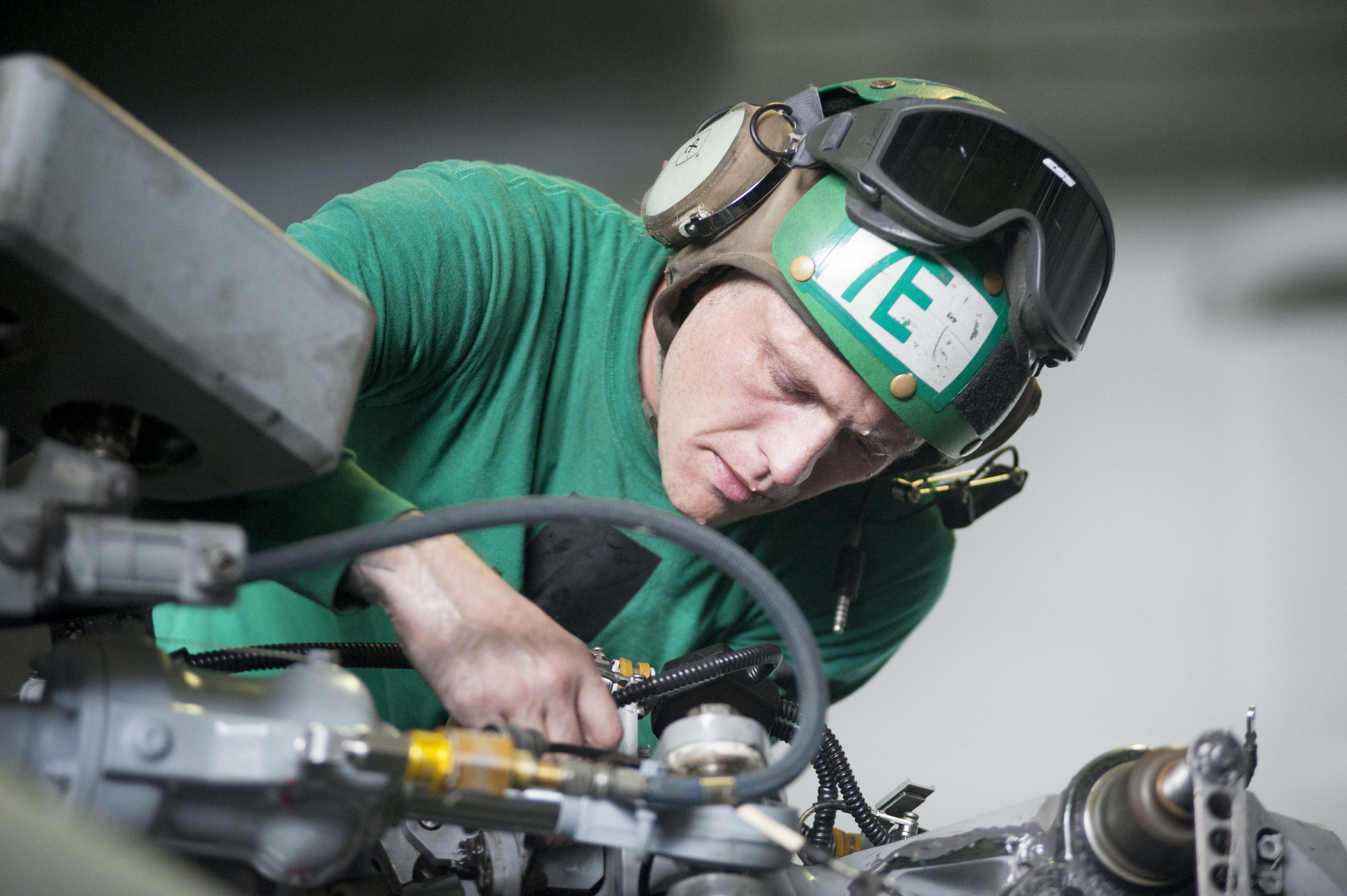
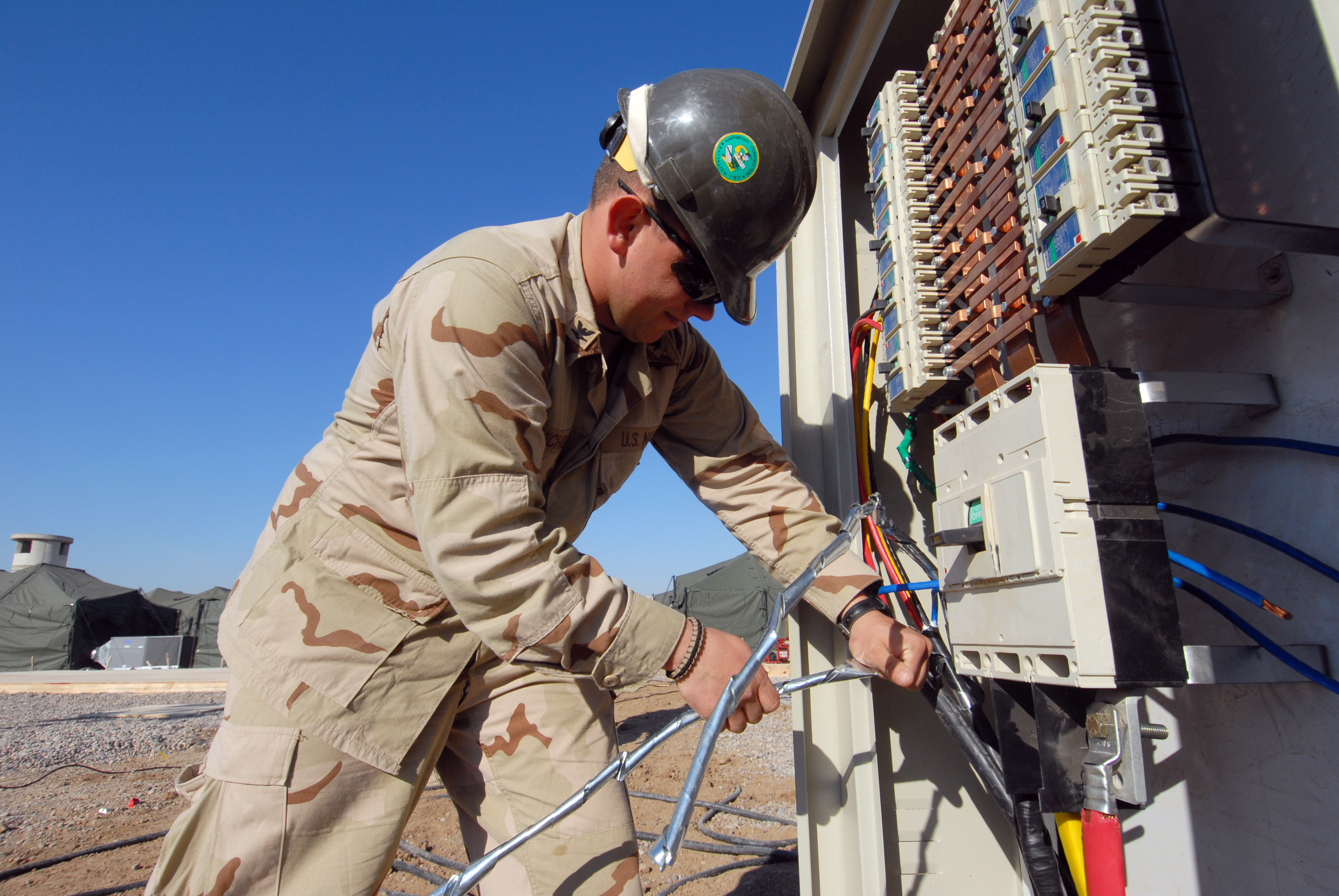
Although many electricians work for private contractors, many electricians get their start in the military.

Army – 12R, 15F
Air Force – Avionics electricians
Marines – 1141 and 63/64 avionics

Navy – AE, CE, EM

Apprenticeships offices in the United States

The United States does not offer nationwide licensing and electrical licenses are issued by individual states. There are variations in licensing requirements, however, all states recognize three basic skill categories: level electricians. Journeyperson electricians can work unsupervised provided that they work according to a master's direction. Generally, states do not offer journeyperson permits, and journeyperson electricians and other apprentices can only work under permits issued to a master electrician. Apprentices may not work without direct supervision.

Before electricians can work unsupervised, they are usually required to serve an apprenticeship lasting three to five years under the general supervision of a master electrician and usually the direct supervision of a journeyperson electrician. Schooling in electrical theory and electrical building codes is required to complete the apprenticeship program. Many apprenticeship programs provide a salary to the apprentice during training. A journeyperson electrician is a classification of licensing granted to those who have met the experience requirements for on the job training (usually 4,000 to 6,000 hours) and classroom hours (about 144 hours). Requirements include completion of two to six years of apprenticeship training and passing a licensing exam.

==== Reciprocity ====
An electrician's license is valid for work in the state where the license was issued. In addition, many states recognize licenses from other states, sometimes called interstate reciprocity participation, although there can be conditions imposed. For example, California reciprocates with Arizona, Nevada, and Utah on the condition that licenses are in good standing and have been held at the other state for five years. Nevada reciprocates with Arizona, California, and Utah. Maine reciprocates with New Hampshire and Vermont at the master level, and the state reciprocates with New Hampshire, North Dakota, Idaho, Oregon, Vermont, and Wyoming at the journeyperson level. Colorado maintains a journeyperson alliance with Alaska, Arkansas, the Dakotas, Idaho, Iowa, Minnesota, Montana, Nebraska, New Hampshire, New Mexico, Oklahoma, Utah, and Wyoming.

== Tools ==
Electricians use a range of hand and power tools and instruments.

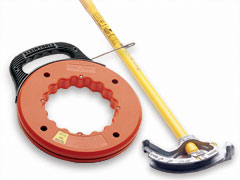
Two of the tools commonly used by electricians. The fish tape is used to pull conductors through conduits, or sometimes to pull conductors through hollow walls. The conduit bender is used to make accurate bends and offsets in electrical conduit.

Some of the more common tools are:

- Conduit bender: Bender used to bend various types of electrical conduit. These come in many variations including hand, electrical, and hydraulic powered.
- Non-contact voltage testers
- Lineman's pliers: Heavy-duty pliers for general use in cutting, bending, crimping and pulling wire.
- Diagonal pliers (also known as side cutters or Dikes): Pliers consisting of cutting blades for use on smaller gauge wires, but sometimes also used as a gripping tool for removal of nails and staples.
- Needle-nose pliers: Pliers with a long, tapered gripping nose of various size, with or without cutters, generally smaller and for finer work (including very small tools used in electronics wiring).
- Wire strippers: Plier-like tool available in many sizes and designs featuring special blades to cut and strip wire insulation while leaving the conductor wire intact and without nicks. Some wire strippers include cable strippers among their multiple functions, for removing the outer cable jacket.
- Cable cutters: Highly leveraged pliers for cutting larger cable.
- Armored cable cutters: Commonly referred to by the trademark 'Roto-Split', is a tool used to cut the metal sleeve on MC (Metal Clad) cable.
- Multimeter: An instrument for electrical measurement with multiple functions. It is available as analog or digital display. Common features include: voltage, resistance, and current. Some models offer additional functions.
- Unibit, Step-bit: Metal-cutting drill bits with stepped-diameter cutting edges to enable convenient drilling holes in preset increments in stamped/rolled metal up to about 1.6mm (1/16 inch) thick. Commonly used to create custom knock-outs in a breaker panel or junction box.
- Cord, rope or fish tape. Used to manipulate cables and wires through cavities. The fishing tool is pushed, dropped, or shot into the installed raceway, stud-bay or joist-bay of a finished wall or in a floor or ceiling. Then the wire or cable is attached and pulled back.
- Crimping tools: Used to apply terminals or splices. These may be hand or hydraulic powered. Some hand tools have ratchets to insure proper pressure. Hydraulic units achieve cold welding, even for aluminum cable.
- Insulation resistance tester: Commonly referred to as a megger, these testers apply several hundred to several thousand volts to cables and equipment to determine the insulation resistance value.
- Knockout punch: For punching holes into boxes, panels, switchgear, etc. for inserting cable & pipe connectors.
- GFCI/RCD testers: Used to test the functionality of Ground-Fault Interrupting receptacles.
- Voltmeter: An electrician's tool used to measure electrical potential difference between two points in an electric circuit.
- Other general-use tools include screwdrivers, hammers, reciprocating saws, drywall saws, flashlights, chisels, tongue and groove pliers (Commonly referred to as 'Channellock®' pliers, a famous manufacturer of this tool) and drills.

== Safety ==
In addition to the workplace hazards generally faced by industrial workers, electricians are also particularly exposed to injury by electricity. An electrician may experience electric shock due to direct contact with energized circuit conductors or due to stray voltage caused by faults in a system. An electric arc exposes eyes and skin to hazardous amounts of heat and light. Faulty switchgear may cause an arc flash incident with a resultant blast. Electricians are trained to work safely and take many measures to minimize the danger of injury. Lockout and tagout procedures are used to make sure that circuits are proven to be de-energized before work is done. Limits of approach to energized equipment protect against arc flash exposure; specially designed flash-resistant clothing provides additional protection; grounding (earthing) clamps and chains are used on line conductors to provide a visible assurance that a conductor is de-energized. Personal protective equipment provides electrical insulation as well as protection from mechanical impact; gloves have insulating rubber liners, and work boots and hard hats are specially rated to provide protection from shock. If a system cannot be de-energized, insulated tools are used; even high-voltage transmission lines can be repaired while energized, when necessary.

Electrical workers, which includes electricians, accounted for 34% of total electrocutions of construction trades workers in the United States between 1992 and 2003.

== Working conditions ==
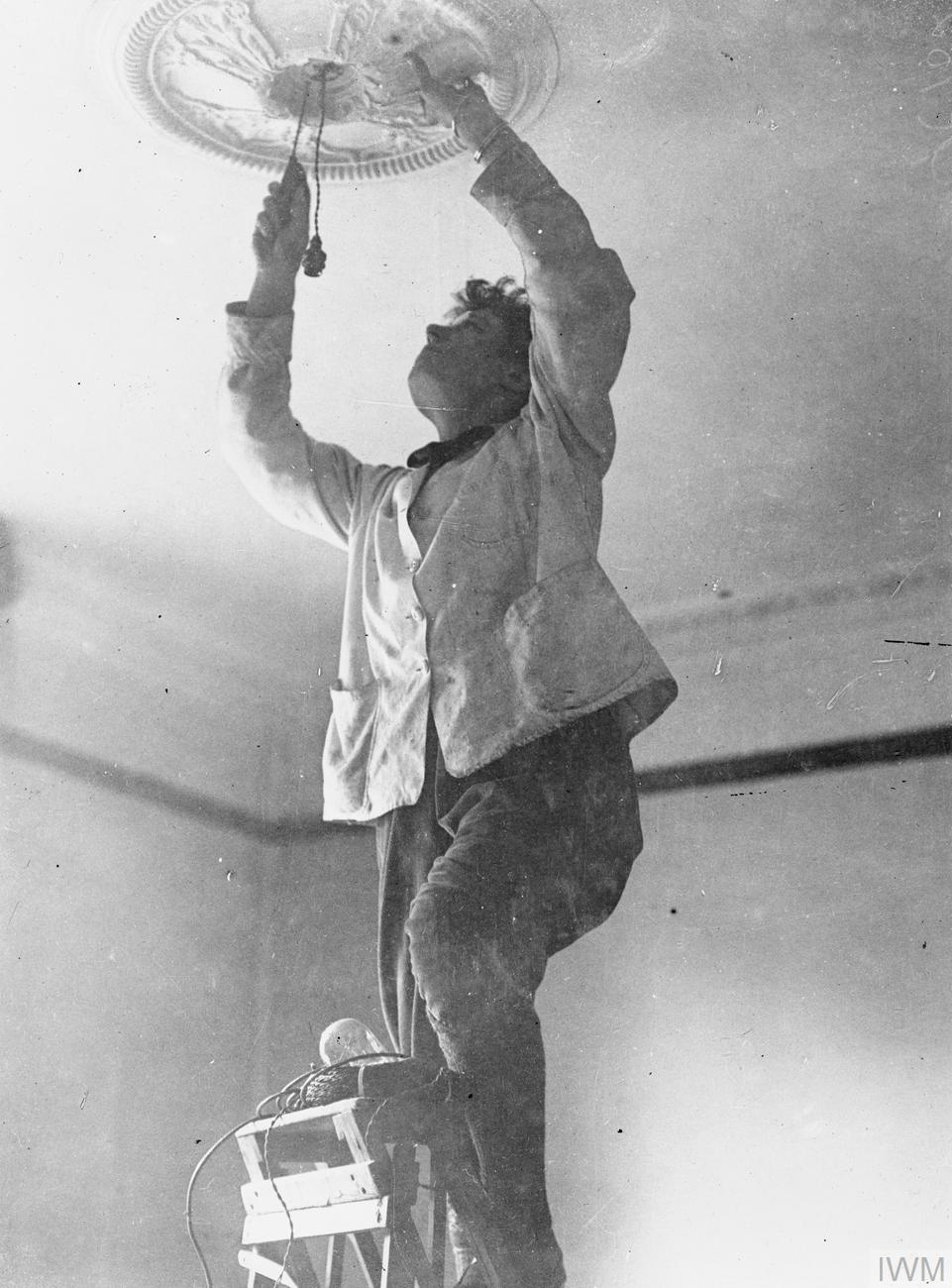
An electrician on a ladder, installing a light fixture c. 1914-1918

Working conditions for electricians vary by specialization. Generally an electrician's work is physically demanding such as climbing ladders and lifting tools and supplies. Occasionally an electrician must work in a cramped space or on scaffolding, and may frequently be bending, squatting or kneeling, to make connections in awkward locations. Construction electricians may spend much of their days in outdoor or semi-outdoor loud and dirty work sites. Industrial electricians may be exposed to the heat, dust, and noise of an industrial plant. Power systems electricians may be called to work in all kinds of adverse weather to make emergency repairs.

== Trade organizations ==
Some electricians are union members and work under their union's policies.

=== Australia ===
Electricians can choose to be represented by the Electrical Trade Union (ETU). Electrical Contractors can be represented by the National Electrical & Communications Association or Master Electricians Australia.

=== North America ===
Some electricians are union members. Some examples of electricians' unions include the International Brotherhood of Electrical Workers, Canadian Union of Public Employees, and the International Association of Machinists and Aerospace Workers.
The International Brotherhood of Electrical Workers provides its own apprenticeships through its National Joint Apprenticeship and Training Committee and the National Electrical Contractors Association. Many merit shop training and apprenticeship programs also exist, including those offered by such as trade associations as Associated Builders and Contractors and Independent Electrical Contractors. These organizations provide comprehensive training, in accordance with U.S. Department of Labor regulations.

=== United Kingdom/Ireland ===
In the United Kingdom, electricians are represented by several unions including Unite the Union

In the Republic of Ireland there are two self-regulation/self certification bodies RECI Register of Electrical Contractors of Ireland and ECSSA.

== Auto electrician ==
An auto electrician is a tradesperson specializing in electrical wiring of motor vehicles. Auto electricians may be employed in the installation of new electrical components or the maintenance and repair of existing electrical components. Auto electricians specialize in cars and commercial vehicles. The auto electrical trade is generally more difficult than the electrical trade due to the confined spaces, engineering complexity of modern automotive electrical systems, and working conditions (often roadside breakdowns or on construction sites, mines, quarries to repair machinery etc.) Also the presence of high-current DC electricity makes injury from burns and arc-flash injury possible.

== See also ==
- Lineworker
- Gaffer (Term used in film and television)
- International Brotherhood of Electrical Workers
- List of electricians, notable individuals who have worked as electricians
- Electronics technician
