= Edward Hill =

Edward Hill may refer to:

== Entertainers ==
- Edward Hill (painter) (1843–1923), American artist
- Edward Burlingame Hill (1872–1960), American composer
- Eduard Khil (1934–2012) or Edward Hill, Russian singer

== Politicians ==
- Edward Hill (Virginian politician) (died c. 1663), Speaker of the Virginia House of Burgesses
- Edward Hill Jr. (1637–1700), son of Edward Hill (Virginian politician), also planter, burgess and briefly Speaker
- Edward Smith Hill (1818–1880), Australian politician
- Edward Hill (Mississippi politician) (died 1885), American politician and postmaster
- Sir Edward Stock Hill (1834–1902), English politician, MP for Bristol South 1886–1900
- Edward Hill (New Zealand politician) (1907–2001), English-born New Zealand politician

== Other ==
- Edward Rowley Hill (1795–1878), British Army officer
- Edward Hill (Medal of Honor) (1835–1900), American soldier, Medal of Honor recipient
- Edward H. Hill (1844–1904), physician who founded Central Maine Medical Center, Lewiston, Maine
- Edward Gurney Hill (1847–1933), American nurseryman and rose breeder
- Ted Hill, Baron Hill of Wivenhoe (Edward James Hill, 1899–1969), British trade unionist
- Ted Hill (Australian communist) (Edward Fowler Hill, 1915–1988), Australian lawyer
- Eddie Hill (born 1936), American drag racer
- Edward Hill (Salvation Army officer) (active since 1993), chief of the staff of the Salvation Army
- Edward Hill (physician) (active 1995–2006), physician and former President of the American Medical Association

== See also ==
- Ed Hill (disambiguation)
- Ned C. Hill (born 1945), American business management professor
- Ted Hill (disambiguation)
- Hill (surname)
