= List of electricians =

An electrician is a tradesman specializing in electrical wiring of buildings, stationary machines and related equipment. This is a list of notable people who have been electricians.

== Australia ==
- Laurie Brereton, politician
- Colin Brooks, politician
- Harry Jensen, unionist and politician
- Gil Langley, cricketer
- Ian Maxfield, unionist and politician
- Josh McCrone, Rugby League player
- William Laird Smith, unionist and politician, Minister for the Navy
- Mike Symon, politician
- Peter Turnbull, World War II fighter ace

== Bermuda ==
- Johnny Barnes, noted as a national institution for greeting commuters

== Brazil ==
- Roberto Azevêdo, diplomat
- Delcídio do Amaral, politician
- Silas Rondeau, politician

== Canada ==
- John Babcock, First World War veteran
- David Bjornson, Progressive Conservative Member of Parliament 1988-1993 for Selkirk-Red River
- Navraj Singh Goraya, rapper, producer and audio engineer
- David Price, politician
- Fred Rose, politician and Soviet spy

== France ==
- Pierre Le Guennec, former possessor of many works by Picasso

== Germany ==
- Hermann Einstein, father of Albert Einstein. Hermann and his brother Jakob founded an electrical engineering company called Einstein & Cie.

== Iceland ==
- Guðmundur Gunnarsson, union leader

== Ireland ==
- Conor Cusack, hurler
- Karl Shiels, actor

== Israel ==
- Dror Adani, convicted for conspiracy to murder
- Haim Corfu, politician
- Moshe Flimann, politician
- Alex Goldfarb, politician
- Yeruham Zeisel, politician

== New Zealand ==
- Alfred Ngaro, politician

== Poland ==
- Stanisław Jaros, executed for assassination attempts
- Lech Wałęsa, 2nd president of Poland

== Russia ==
- Yevgeny Nikonov, Soviet naval war hero from Estonia

== United Kingdom ==
- Frank Chapple, union leader
- Alan Charles, Police Commissioner
- Liam Cunningham, actor
- Ivor Linton, footballer
- Stuart Pearce, footballer

== United States ==
- Elmer Baumann, union leader and politician
- Thomas Bell, novelist
- Clipper Darrell, superfan
- Adam DeBus, baseball player
- Lex Green, politician
- Micky Hammon, politician
- Bobby Henon, politician
- Edwin D. Hill, union leader
- William J. Lindsay, politician
- Francis Mahoney, basketball player
- Richard Christy, musician and radio personality
- Mike Maronna, actor
- Brian McMahan, guitarist
- Donald Norcross, politician
- Joseph C. Palczynski, spree killer
- Thomas Harrison Provenzano, convicted murderer
- Jesse Sullivan, amputee who was given a robotic arm
- Donald Turnupseed, the other driver in James Dean's fatal accident
- Frank Weddig, politician

== See also ==
- List of welders
