= Spring steel =

Variety of steel

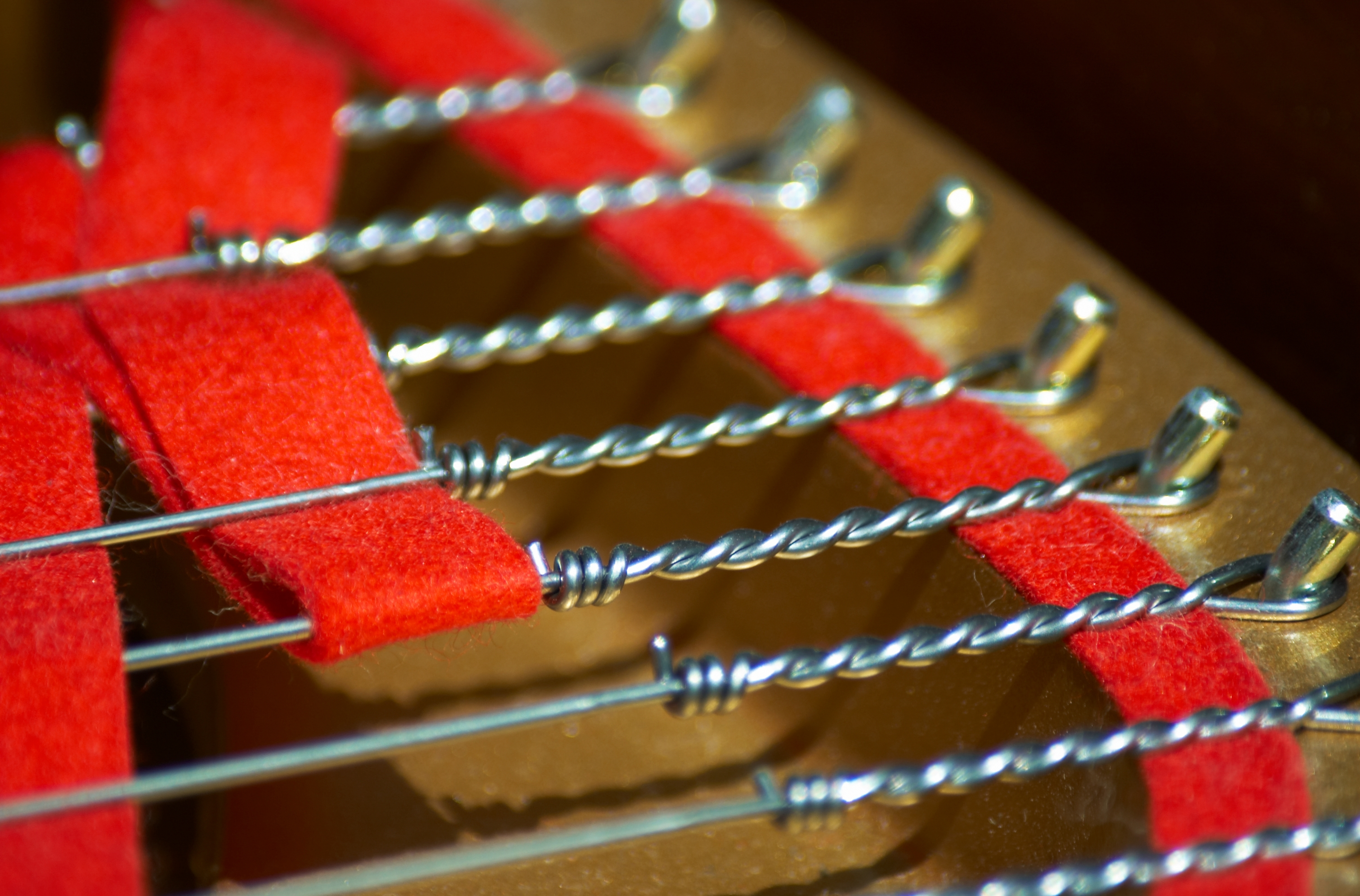
Piano wire is made from spring steel.

Spring steel is a name given to a wide range of steels used in the manufacture of different products, including swords, saw blades, springs and many more. These steels are generally low-alloy manganese, medium-carbon steel or high-carbon steel with a very high yield strength. This allows objects made of spring steel to return to their original shape despite significant deflection or twisting.

== Grades ==
Many grades of steel can be hardened and tempered to increase elasticity and resist deformation; however, some steels are inherently more elastic than others:

Common spring steel grades
SAE grade (ASTM grade)	Composition	Yield strength	Hardness (HRC)		Comments
SAE grade (ASTM grade)	Composition	Yield strength	Typical	Maximum	Comments
1070	0.65-0.75% C, 0.60-0.90% Mn, max .050% S, max .040% P	Normally supplied annealed	165vpn	180vpn	CS70, CK67, C70E
1074/1075	0.70–0.80% C, 0.50–0.80% Mn, max. 0.030% P, max. 0.035% S	62–78 ksi (430–540 MPa)	44–50	50	Scaleless blue, or Polished Bright
1080 (A228)	0.7–1.0% C, 0.2–0.6% Mn, 0.1–0.3% Si				Piano wire, music wire, springs, clutch discs
1095 (A684)	0.90–1.03% C, 0.30–0.50% Mn, max. 0.030% P, max. 0.035% S	60–75 ksi (410–520 MPa), annealed	48–51	59	Blue, or polished bright spring steel
5160 (A689)	0.55–0.65% C, 0.75–1.00% Mn, 0.70–0.90% Cr	97 ksi (670 MPa)		63	Chrome-silicon spring steel; fatigue-resistant
50CrV4 (EN 10277)	0.47–0.55% C, max. 1.10% Mn, 0.90–1.20% Cr, 0.10–0.20% V, max. 0.40% Si	170 ksi (1,200 MPa)			Old British 735 H1steel, SAE 6150, 735A51
9255	0.50–0.60% C, 0.70–0.95% Mn, 1.80–2.20% Si				
301 spring-tempered stainless steel	0.08–0.15% C, max. 2.00% Mn, 16.00–18.00% Cr, 6.00–8.00% Ni	147 ksi (1,010 MPa)		42	Equivalents EN 10088-2 1.4310, X10CrNi18-8

== Applications ==
- Applications include piano wire, spring clamps, antennas, springs (e. g. vehicle coil springs or leaf springs), and s-tines.
- Spring steel is commonly used in the manufacture of swords with rounded edges for training or stage combat, as well as sharpened swords for collectors and live combat.
- Spring steel is one of the most popular materials used in the fabrication of lockpicks due to its pliability and resilience.
- Tubular spring steel is used in the landing gear of some small aircraft due to its ability to absorb the impact of landing.
- It is frequently used in the making of knives, machetes, and other edged tools.
- It is a key component in electrician's fish tape.
- It is used in binder clips.
- Used extensively in shims due to its resistance to deformation in low thicknesses.

== See also ==
- Martensite
