= IBEW Building =

Historic union hall in St. Louis

- U.S. National Register of Historic Places
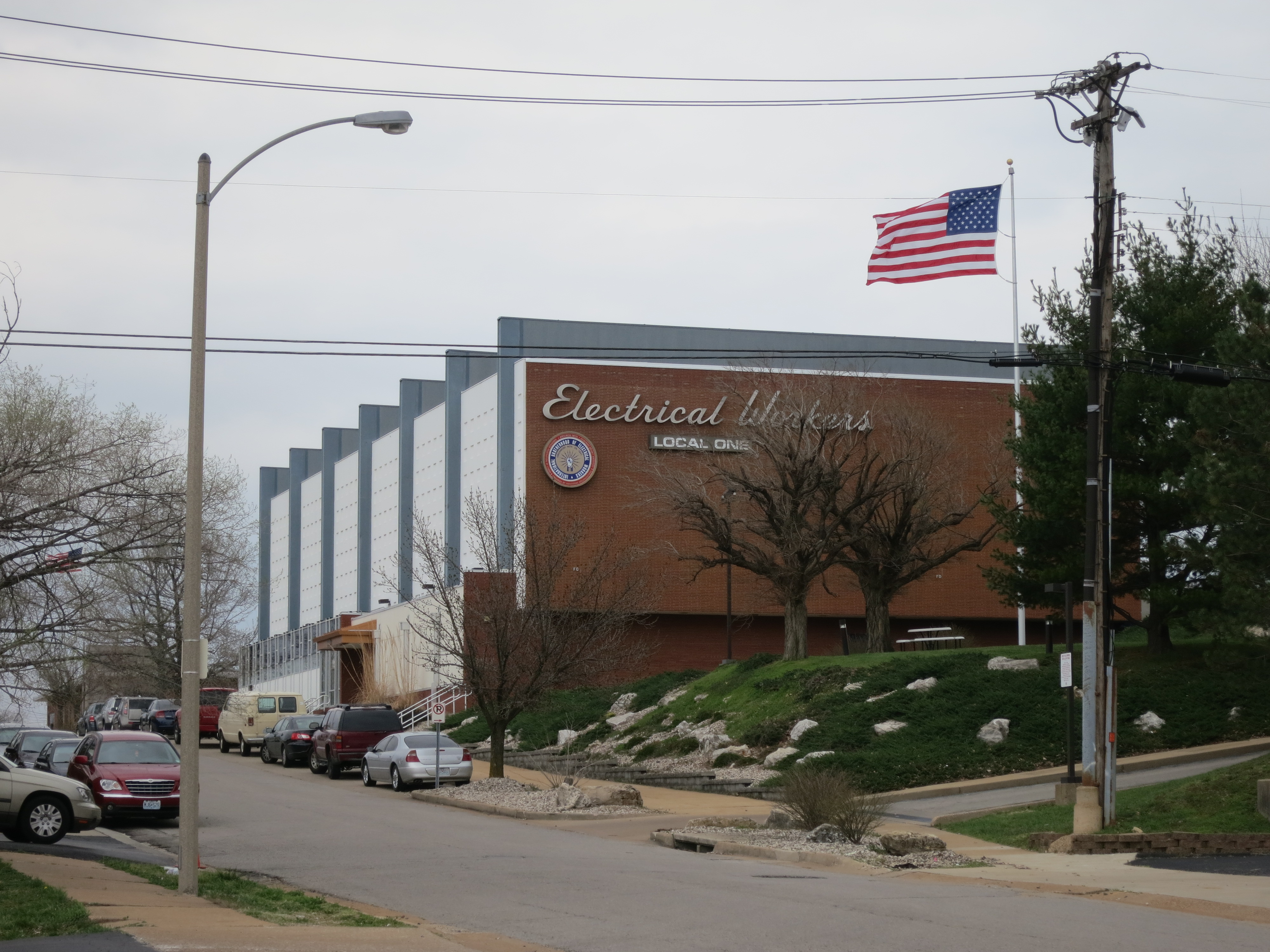
- The side of the building showing the hillside

- Location within St. Louis Location within Missouri Location within the United States
- Location: 5850 Elizabeth Avenue, St. Louis, Missouri 63110
- Coordinates: 38°36′53″N 90°17′07″W
- Area: The Hill
- Built: 1960
- Built by: Bank Building and Equipment Company (BBEC)
- Architects: Perry Langston, Wenceslao Sarmiento
- Architectural style: Mid-century modern, International Style
- Website: ibewlocal1.org
- NRHP reference No.: 100004062
- Added to NRHP: June 17, 2019

The IBEW Building is a union hall in St. Louis, Missouri, listed on the National Register of Historic Places. The International Brotherhood of Electrical Workers (IBEW) Local 1 continues to occupy the purpose-built building.

== History ==
In 1891, Henry Miller founded a national organization for electricians at a convention held in his house in St. Louis with the local union being the first to join. The Local 1 members continued to meet in rented facilities until 1928 when they purchased a former church in the Forest Park Southeast neighborhood. As the union grew and the membership increasingly drove cars in the 1950s, that space no longer met their needs for lack of parking.

In 1959, the organization hired the Bank Building and Equipment Corporation to build a new union hall, just as the firm was expanding to serve clients outside of banking. Perry Langston served as the architect of record but worked under the supervision of Wenceslao Sarmiento. The building was completed in 1960 and remodeled in the 1980s.

In recent years, Local 1 continues to grow and is one of the largest unions in the St. Louis area. In addition to membership meetings, the union uses the hall for events and fundraisers.

== Architecture ==
Langston designed the two-story building in a mid-century modern International Style of architecture. The post-war materials used in construction include concrete, vinyl laminated concrete, steel, plate glass, and aluminum. The building is in The Hill neighborhood and the property is itself on a hillside. The front first floor is accessed from the street while the large parking lot provides direct access to the back second floor.

The front of the building is dominated by seven blue painted beams that create exaggerated vertical fins that continue past the parapet to rise above the roofline. This creates six bays and allows the curtain wall to visibly hang from the structure. Only the first floor has windows, but the rest of the face is covered in white concave panels. The building now has multicolor lights that change the color of the building at night to celebrate holidays or support causes.

The shorter back of the building mirrors the front with white panels in six bays, each with a double door to allow quick access to the parking lot. In contrast, the side elevations along the hill are clad in Roman brick. One side has an original sign reading “Electrical Workers" in a chrome finish.

For the interior, the lower main entrance contains imitation marble walls and a terrazzo floor featuring the logo of the union. Beyond that, the first floor has separate rooms including the reception area, hiring hall, leadership offices, and board room. In contrast, the upper floor consists of a single-span meeting hall that can accommodate 900 people with a stage and concession stand on the periphery.

== See also ==
- Henry Miller Museum
- National Register of Historic Places listings in St. Louis south and west of downtown
