= Registered apprenticeship =

Registered Apprenticeship is a program of the United States Department of Labor that connects job seekers looking to learn new skills with employers looking for qualified workers. Employers, employer associations, and joint labor-management organizations, known collectively as "sponsors", provide apprentices with paid on-the-job learning and academic instruction that reflects industry needs. The goal of such instruction is to provide workers with advanced skillsets that meet the specific needs of their employers.

== History ==
Following the creation of the first Registered Apprenticeship system in Wisconsin in 1911, the United States Congress passed the National Apprenticeship Act (known as the "Fitzgerald Act") in 1937, establishing federal Registered Apprenticeship. Initially, Registered Apprenticeship programs consisted mainly of the manufacturing, construction and utilities industries. After World War II, Registered Apprenticeship began to expand into training of health and safety workers, including firefighters, police, and emergency medical technicians. Recently, the program guidelines were revised in late 2008 to allow for greater flexibility in serving apprentices and program sponsors in prevailing economic conditions. Currently, Registered Apprenticeship includes 29,000 programs impacting 250,000 employers, involving approximately 450,000 apprentices.

== Role of the U.S. government ==
The National Apprenticeship Act authorizes the Federal government, in cooperation with the states, to oversee the nation's apprenticeship system. The U.S. Department of Labor's Office of Apprenticeship works in conjunction with both the Bureau of Apprenticeship and Training states that report directly to the Federal government as well independent State Apprenticeship Agencies to administer the program. These agencies are responsible for:

- Registering apprenticeship programs that meet Federal and State standards
- Protecting the safety and welfare of apprentices
- Issuing nationally recognized and portable Certificates of Completion to apprentices
- Promoting the development of new programs through marketing and technical assistance
- Assuring that all programs provide high quality training
- Assuring that all programs produce skilled competent workers.

== Program benefits and requirements ==
Registered Apprenticeship provides a wide array of benefits to employers, employees, unions, and other stakeholders. For employers, the program provides a pipeline of skilled workers enrolled in customized programs that meet a variety of the employer's needs, e.g., increased competitiveness or higher worker retention rates. For workers, enrolled apprentices receive a paycheck that is guaranteed to increase as their training and skill levels increase. Apprentices also complete a combination of industry-specific classroom education and hands-on career training leading to nationally recognized, portable Certificates of Completion.

Registered Apprenticeship program sponsors identify the minimum qualifications to apply into their apprenticeship program. The eligible starting age can be no less than 16 years of age; however, individuals must usually be 18 to be an apprentice in hazardous occupations. Program sponsors may also identify additional minimum qualifications and credentials to apply, e.g., education, ability to physically perform the essential functions of the occupation, proof of age. Based on the selection method utilized by the sponsor, additional qualification standards, such as fair aptitude tests and interviews, school grades, and previous work experience may be identified.
