= Fish tape =

Tool used to install electrical wires in tubes

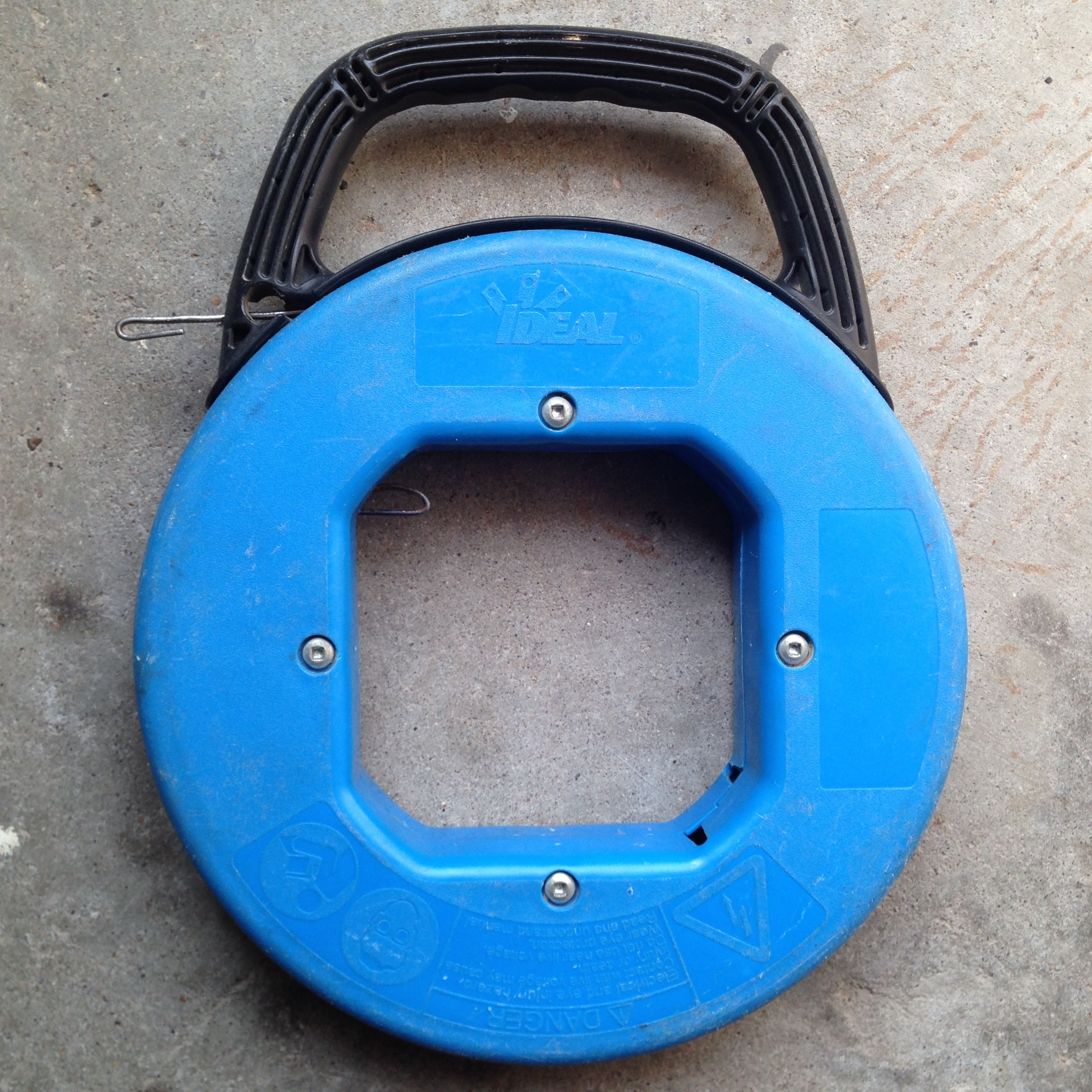
A 75-foot (23 m) steel fish tape

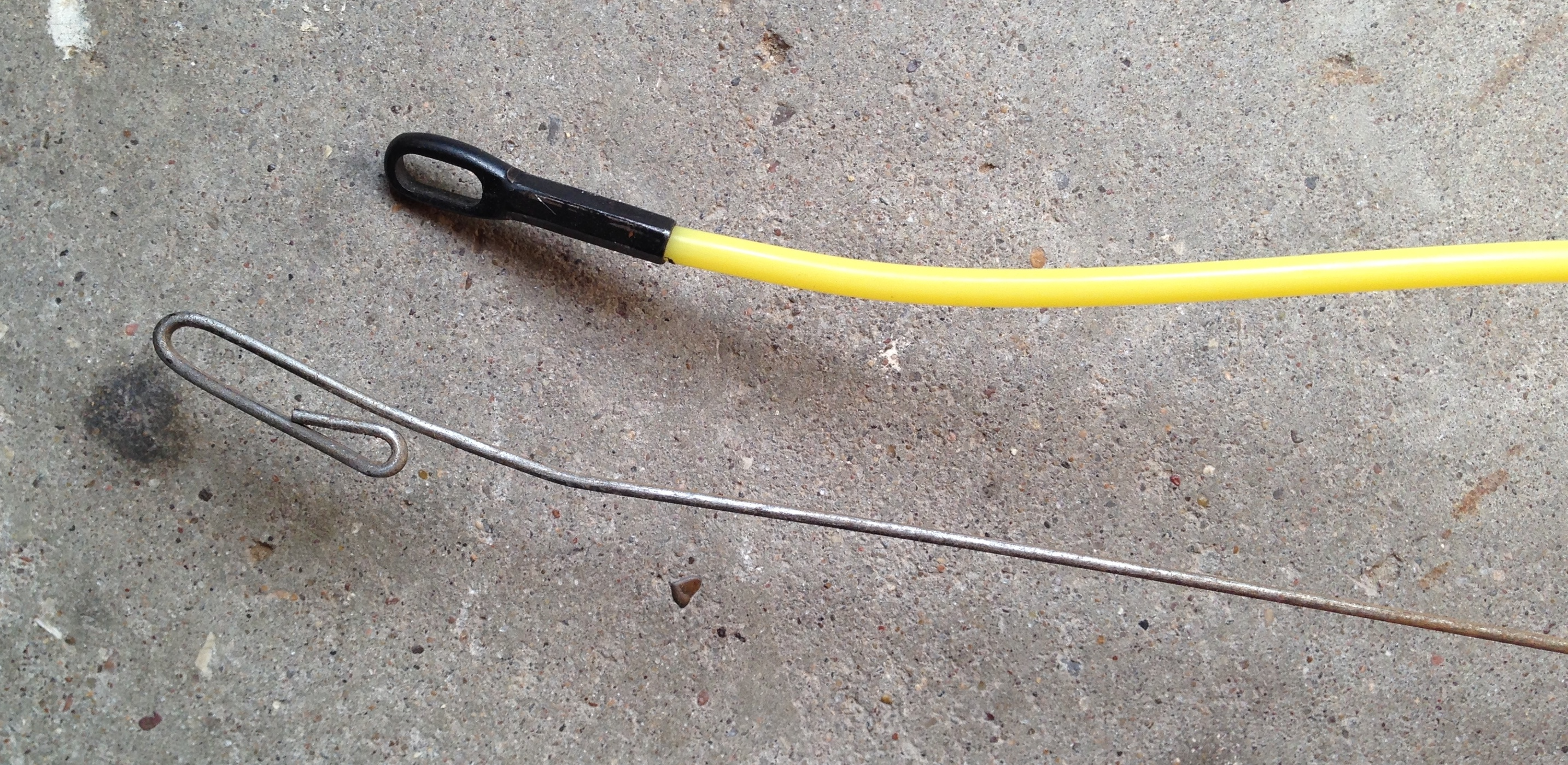
A comparison of nylon (top) and steel (bottom) fish tapes

A fish tape (also called a draw wire, draw tape, or an electrician's snake) is a tool used by electricians to route new wiring through walls and electrical conduit.

Made of a narrow band of spring steel, by careful manipulation, the tape can be guided through confined spaces such as wall cavities or conduits in many countries. The goal is to push toward an area where guide string has been dropped inside the confined space and to pull it through, so the guide string can then be used to pull through various types of wiring, such as phone wire, network cables or speaker wire. Fish tape is designed to pull through guide string only. Using it to directly pull the target wire can damage or warp the fish tape.

== Design ==
Fish tapes are usually stored coiled on a plastic reel. Because of this, they have a natural curvature and it is this curvature that allows them to be guided. By manipulating the reel, the end of the tape can be directed slightly. The tape is rigid enough that it can then be pushed in the direction in which it is pointing. In this way it can be easily guided through an empty wall cavity. Thermal insulation, firestops, pipes, HVAC ducts, electrical conduits, and other obstructions make use of a fish tape more challenging.

The "tape" can be made from many different materials including steel, fiberglass, and nylon. The tape usually has a special end ranging from a hook or loop to a specialized fastener device to allow the user to attach the tape to the guide string (or a very light cable) before pulling.

== Invention and patent ==
Keith Leroy Wilson of Colorado Springs, Colorado, owner of the Electrical Construction Co, founded in 1947; invented the Fish Tape Snagger. Wilson filed the original patent on 29 Mar 1960 and Patent # 3,035,817 was awarded on 22 May 1962 by the US Patent Office.

== Double use ==
Occasionally, two fish tapes are used from opposite ends of the wall. Because they each have a hooked end, one fish tape is capable of catching the other, and the one tape can then be pulled back, carrying the second tape out with it. Electricians sometimes attach a battery and a doorbell or buzzer to two fish tapes so that when the ends of the tapes make contact with each other (within the wall), the bell rings.
