= Lonnie R. Stephenson =

American labor union leader (born 1956)

Lonnie R. Stephenson (born July 1956) is a former American labor union leader.

Born in Rock Island, Illinois, Stephenson completed an apprenticeship as an electrical wireman in 1975, and joined the International Brotherhood of Electrical Workers (IBEW). He held various positions in his local union, before becoming its business manager in 1996. In 2002, he was appointed as an international representative for the union, covering its sixth district, and in 2010 he was elected as a vice-president of the union.

In 2015, Stephenson was appointed as president of the union, and he was elected to the post on a permanent basis the following year. He was also elected as a vice-president of the AFL-CIO. Under his leadership, membership of IBEW grew each year. He focused on diversity, equity and inclusion, worker safety, and training. He was also the first major labor union leader to endorse Joe Biden's bid for President of the United States. He retired early in 2023.

Trade union offices
Preceded by Edwin D. Hill	President of the International Brotherhood of Electrical Workers; 2015–2023	Succeeded by Kenneth W. Cooper
