= Henry Miller (IBEW) =

American labor leader (1853–1896)

Henry Miller (January 5, 1853 - July 10, 1896) was an American electrical worker who became the first Grand President of the International Brotherhood of Electrical Workers (IBEW).

Miller was born on a ranch near Fredericksburg, Texas. He worked as a water boy for a government project to string a telegraph line from San Antonio, Texas, to Fort Clark when he was 14. He worked for Western Union and other utility companies just starting out as a lineman. In 1886, Miller worked for the St. Louis Municipal Electric Light and Power Company. During this time, he saw an opportunity to organize electrical workers when they came to the St. Louis Exposition in 1890.

== Museum ==
In 2015, IBEW Local 1 in St. Louis purchased Miller's home where the union was founded with the intent of celebrating both the life of Miller and labor history. In 2016, the Henry Miller Museum opened as part of the 125 anniversary for the IBEW.
