= Theodore Hill =

Theodore Hill may refer to:

- Ted Hill (mathematician) (Theodore Preston Hill, born 1943), U.S. mathematician
- Theodore Hill (Australian politician), Electoral district of Oxley
- Theodore Hill (American politician), member of the 38th New York State Legislature

== See also ==
- Ted Hill (disambiguation)
