= Kenneth W. Cooper =

American labor union leader

Kenneth W. Cooper (born February 1961) is an American labor union leader.

Cooper grew up in Mansfield, Ohio, where he completed an apprenticeship as an electrical wireman. He joined the International Brotherhood of Electrical Workers in 1985, and held various posts in his local union before being elected as its business manager in 1993. In 2002, he moved to Las Vegas, where he became assistant business manager of the local, and succeeded in organizing workers at the Nevada Power Company.

In 2006, Cooper was appointed as a full-time international representative for the union, covering its fourth district, and then in 2011 he was elected as a vice president, with responsibility for the district. In the role, he organized more than one thousand workers at Baltimore Gas and Electric. He was elected as secretary-treasurer of the union in 2017, and then was appointed as president in 2023. He was also elected as a vice-president of the AFL-CIO.

Trade union offices
Preceded by Sam Chilia	Secretary-Treasurer of the International Brotherhood of Electrical Workers; 2017–2022	Succeeded by Paul Noble
Preceded by Lonnie R. Stephenson	President of the International Brotherhood of Electrical Workers; 2023–present	Succeeded by Incumbent
