= Ted Hill =

Ted Hill may refer to:

- Ted Hill (mathematician) (Theodore Preston Hill, born 1943), U.S. mathematician
- Ted Hill, Baron Hill of Wivenhoe (1899–1969), British trade unionist
- Ted Hill (Australian communist) (Edward Fowler Hill, 1915–1988), Australian barrister and communist activist
- Ted Hill (footballer) (1914–1986), Australian rules footballer
- Ted Hill (rugby union) (born 1999), English rugby union player
- Teddy Hill (1909–1978), American big band leader
- Ted Hill, British comedian, finalist in Britain's Got Talent series 19

== See also ==
- Edward Hill (disambiguation)
- Theodore Hill (disambiguation)
- Ted Hills, a fictional character from the BBC soap opera EastEnders
