= National Joint Apprenticeship and Training Committee =

The National Joint Apprenticeship and Training Committee (NJATC) is the former name for the Electrical Training Alliance, a nonprofit organization created in 1941 by the International Brotherhood of Electrical Workers (IBEW) and the National Electrical Contractors Association (NECA).

The NJATC helped developing and standardizing education in the electrical industry by helping members of NECA and the IBEW, create a skilled workforce. The organization worked with various experts to ensure that electrical apprentices in the organized labor movement had access to the most-up-to date training initiatives in the electrical construction industry.

The organization had also hosted the National Training Institute (NTI), the largest electrical training seminar in North America. Nearly 2,000 electrical workers attend this event to learn about new industry trends, to see new products, and to attend in-depth training seminars. NTI is also home to one of the largest electrical trade shows in the construction industry.

As of 2007, there were more than 40,000 electrical apprentices enrolled in JATC programs throughout the United States and Canada. Since its inception, more than 325,000 electrical apprentices have completed NJATC training programs and become competent journeymen, making the organization one of the largest electrical training and apprenticeship programs of its kind.

== Overview ==
Across the United States and Canada more than 200 local Joint Apprenticeship and Training Committees (JATCs) used the NJATC’s curricula to help train electrical apprentices. The NJATC developed electrical training curricula for Inside Wireman, Outside Lineman, Voice-Data-Video (VDV), and Residential Wireman programs. Emerging technologies such as photovoltaics (solar power generation), wind power generation and programmable logic controllers (PLCs) are also encompassed in the NJATC curricula, along with codes and safety and instrumentation training. The organization is also responsible for spearheading a variety of electrical industry certifications such as cable splicing and conduit bending.

Its “Earn While You Learn” initiative allows electrical apprentices to work and earn living wages while receiving related instructional training. This program allowed JATC electrical apprenticeship programs to operate without the financial support of taxpayers. With the help of the American Council on Education; the NJATC has also developed a program that allows electrical apprentices to translate their instructional training into college credits. Depending on their area of study pursued, electrical apprentices could transfer up to 60 college credit hours from their electrical apprenticeship to colleges, universities, or community colleges.
