= Commercial Advancement Training Scheme =

Dual education system adopted from the German

Commercial Advancement Training Scheme (CATS) is a dual education system adopted from the German Dual System and introduced in Namibia in 2005, and South Africa in 1985. It combines apprenticeships in a company and technical education at a University in one course. It is accepted and recognized by the European Union through the German Chamber of Commerce and Industry. The programme is also accredited by the South African Qualifications Authority (SAQA) evaluation level 5 /NQF level 5.

== Namibia ==
Introduced in 2005 in Namibia, classes are offered by the Centre for Enterprise Development (CED) at the Polytechnic of Namibia and practical training is provided by partner companies such as Manica, Namport, Agra, TransNamib, Wesbank Transport, Cymot and others.

== South Africa ==
The system was introduced in South Africa in 1985, thereafter graduating more than 1,600 students in the two countries, with the contribution of 360 companies and institutions.

== Advantages of dual education ==
The student works as an employee of the company from the beginning and receives tasks according to his growing abilities. Companies who employ the student after his education, the company gets a well-trained employee. The student develops both hard and soft skills. The student develops under real conditions, getting an earlier look at what the work entails, earning money in the process.
