= Apprenticeship degree =

United States postsecondary degree

An apprenticeship degree is a U.S. postsecondary system that integrates on-the-job training with an accredited academic degree. In an apprenticeship degree, practical work experience is emphasized, with academic coursework structured around the job training. A degree seeker works full-time for an employer, receives college credit for the work they do on-the-job, and earns an associate degree, bachelor's degree, master's degree, or doctoral degree from an accredited college or university at the end of the program.

Unlike a traditional apprenticeship, an apprenticeship degree operates within credit-bearing higher education. In partnership with an accredited college or university, an apprenticeship degree is most common in industries facing acute labor shortages and in professions that require a degree, such as K-12 education, health care, technology, and business. In some cases, the apprenticeship degree includes a licensure component, such as obtaining a teaching credential.

Apprenticeship degrees can take two to six years to complete, depending on the institution, academic discipline, and previously awarded postsecondary credits. Apprentices are paid from day one through graduation and the degree program is offered with little to no student loan debt. Apprenticeship degrees can be funded by federal, state, or philanthropic sources, depending on the apprenticeship type. Upon completion, apprenticeship degrees typically lead to career advancement at the apprentice's existing employer.

== Concept ==
In building upon work-based learning, competency-based degrees, and college-connected apprenticeships, apprenticeship degrees combine on-the-job training with accredited degree programs.

Apprenticeship degrees enable employers to train employees without a degree to fill professional vacancies, while providing employees a paid, low-to-no cost way to earning a degree and advancing their career. The workplace becomes the degree seeker's primary place of learning, removing the common dilemma of choosing between pursuing a degree full-time or earning a paycheck. The training is directly aligned with the learner's field of study and future profession. On-the-job learning is supported by academic seminars, typically held online outside of work hours.

While similar degree-conferring apprenticeships have long been common in the U.K., Germany, France, and other countries, the integration of an apprenticeship with a traditional degree was first utilized in the U.S. in 2010. Unlike its European counterparts, this apprenticeship-based degree model is referred to as an "apprenticeship degree," rather than a "degree apprenticeship," emphasizing the modification of the traditional U.S. degree experience.

Proponents of apprenticeship degrees view the model as a potential solution to college and university enrollment declines, affordability, and education-to-career alignment. Critics cite inconsistent state and federal funding, barriers to federal recognition, and resistance from faculty members as primary obstacles to broader adoption.

== Expansion ==
In the United States, apprenticeship degree use has been concentrated in teaching, followed by nursing.

Beginning in 2022, in response to continued qualified teacher shortages, the Biden Administration accelerated the expansion of degree-conferring apprenticeships in K-12 education through teacher registered apprenticeships and its investment in quality teacher preparation programs.

These federally-funded programs, commonly referred to as "grow your own" initiatives, aim to train entry-level talent to become licensed teachers. They have garnered bipartisan state support and continue to expand through significant federal and state investments. President Trump recently pledged to provide support to more than one million apprentices.

In 2022, two states offered registered teacher apprenticeships. By January 2025, 49 states received federal approval to offer “registered apprenticeships” in teaching, with growing interest from peer industries facing acute labor shortages.

While apprenticeship degrees offer significant benefits, they can be more time-consuming and costly to develop compared to other apprenticeship models, as the degree is specific to the apprenticeship career pathway, integrates apprenticeship classroom training, and recognizes on-the-job learning credit. Creating a new degree program around an apprenticeship, such as designing new courses or converting non-credit courses into credit-bearing ones, requires faculty and departmental approvals, accreditation reviews, authorization from state higher education offices, and in some cases, approval from the U.S. Department of Education (ED) or U.S. Department of Labor (DOL) for access to federal funding.

In February 2024, the nonprofit National Center for the Apprenticeship Degree (NCAD) was established to assist states, institutions of higher education, employers, and funders in developing apprenticeship degree programs in high-need sectors. NCAD, an initiative of Reach University, serves as an apprenticeship degree intermediary, collaborating with universities, industry partners, and state and local systems to increasing offerings of apprenticeship degrees.

== Usage ==
Community colleges, which are typically more focused on vocational training, to usually more able to adopt and expand apprenticeship degrees in industries such as health care, information technology, business, and advanced manufacturing, where degrees are required for career advancement.

Trident Technical College in Charleston, South Carolina offers over a dozen apprenticeship degree programs. Arapahoe Community College in Littleton, Colorado offers associate apprenticeship degree programs in health care and cybersecurity. Colorado Mountain College, Dallas College, and Brazosport College offer K-12 teacher apprenticeship degrees.

An increasing number of four-year degree-granting institutions are also utilizing apprenticeship degrees. In Fall of 2020, Reach University became the United States' first accredited nonprofit institution of higher education to offer undergraduate apprenticeship degree programs across multiple states, educators across 460 employers as of June 2025. In January 2022, Tennessee became the first state to be approved by the U.S. Department of Labor to establish a permanent Grow Your Own (GYO) model, known as the Tennessee Teacher Apprenticeship program. In Fall 2023, Talent Together Michigan established its position as a statewide intermediary for teaching apprenticeships in partnership with 13 in-state universities and colleges. Talent Together Michigan has launched and scaled Registered Apprenticeship Programs (RAP's) in over 300 school districts, in partnership with 13 colleges and universities in Michigan.

As of May 2025, 400 undergraduates completed Reach's apprenticeship degree, with nearly three quarters graduating on time, surpassing the national six-year graduation rate of 64 percent.
