= International Brotherhood of Electrical Workers =

Trade union

- Abbreviation: IBEW
- Formation: 1891
- Type: Trade union
- Headquarters: Washington, DC, US
- Locations: Canada; Panama; United States
- Members: 901,000 (2026)
- President: Kenneth W. Cooper
- Secretary-treasurer: Paul Noble
- Affiliations: AFL-CIO (North America's Building Trades Unions); Canadian Labour Congress
- Website: ibew.org
- Formerly called: National Brotherhood of Electrical Workers (1891–1899)

The International Brotherhood of Electrical Workers (IBEW) is a labor union that represents approximately 887,000 workers and retirees in the electrical industry in the United States, Canada, Guam, Panama, Puerto Rico, and the US Virgin Islands; in particular electricians, or inside wiremen, in the construction industry and lineworkers and other employees of public utilities. The union also represents some workers in the computer, telecommunications, and broadcasting industries, and other fields related to electrical work.

IBEW conducts apprenticeship programs for electricians, linemen, and VDV (voice, data, and video) installers (who install low-voltage wiring such as computer networks), in conjunction with the National Electrical Contractors Association, under the auspices of the National Joint Apprenticeship and Training Committee, which allows apprentices to "earn while you learn." In Canadian jurisdictions, the IBEW does not deliver apprenticeship training, but does conduct supplemental training for government trained apprentices and journeypersons, often at little or no cost to its members.

== History ==
The organization now known as the International Brotherhood of Electrical Workers was founded in 1891, two years before George Westinghouse won the electric current wars by lighting the Chicago World's Columbian Exposition with alternating current, and before homes and businesses in the United States had begun receiving electricity. It is an international organization, based on the principle of collective bargaining. Its international president is Kenneth W. Cooper and is affiliated with the AFL–CIO.

The IBEW began with the Electrical Wiremen and Linemen's Union No. 5221, founded in St. Louis, Missouri, in 1890. By 1891, after sufficient interest was shown in a national union, a convention was held on November 21, 1891, in St. Louis. At the convention, the IBEW, then known as the National Brotherhood of Electrical Workers (NBEW), was officially formed. The American Federation of Labor gave the NBEW a charter as an AFL affiliate on December 7, 1891. The union's official journal, The Electrical Worker, was first published on January 15, 1893, and has been published ever since. At the 1899 convention in Pittsburgh, Pennsylvania, the union's name was officially changed to the International Brotherhood of Electrical Workers.

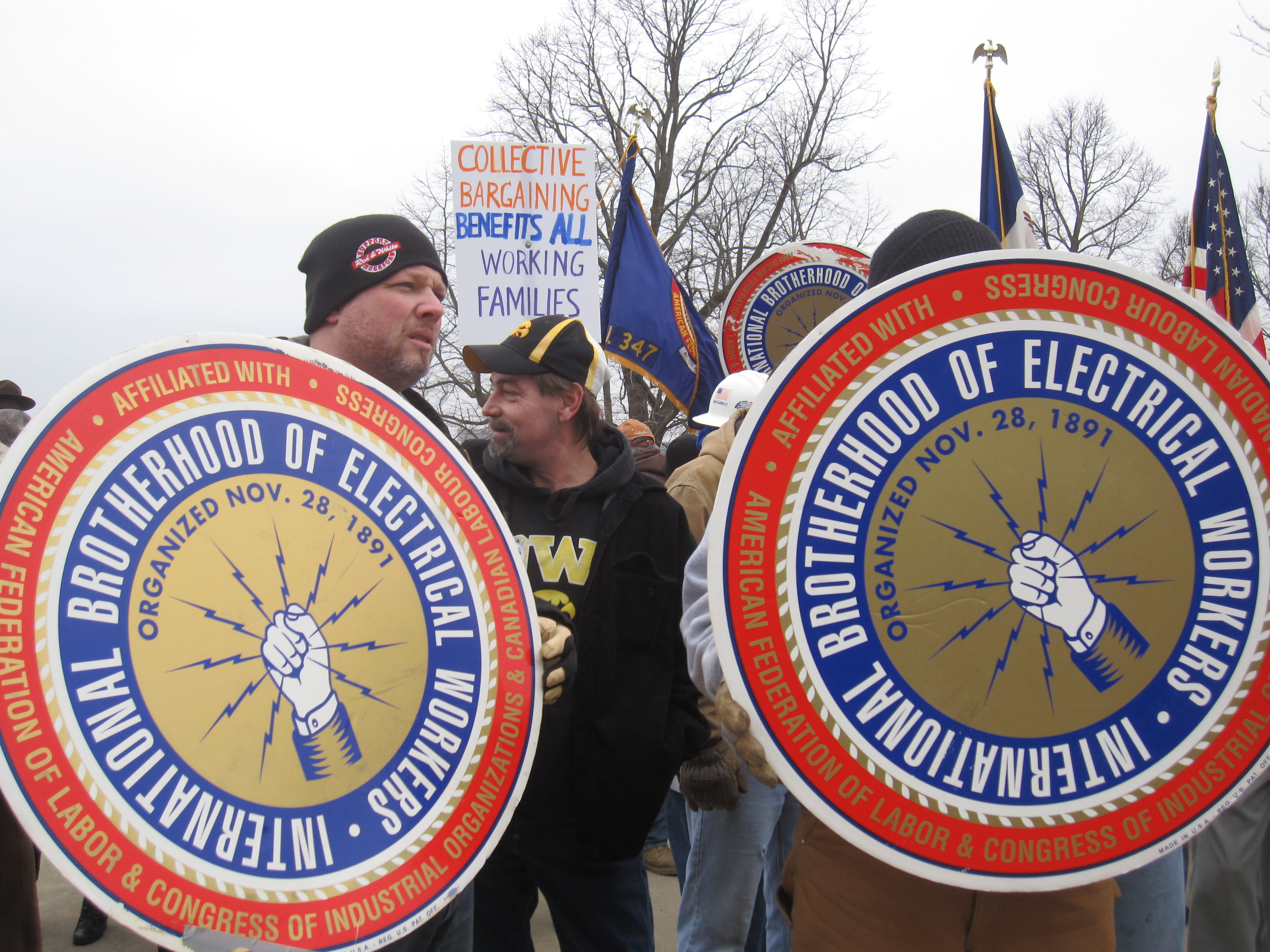
IBEW members holding cutouts of the union's logo at a rally

The union went through lean times in its early years, then struggled through six years of schism during the 1910s, when two rival groups each claimed to be the duly elected leaders of the union. In 1919, as many employers were trying to drive unions out of the workplace through a national open shop campaign, the union agreed to form the Council on Industrial Relations, a bipartite body made up of equal numbers of management and union representatives with the power to resolve any collective bargaining disputes. That body still functions today, and has largely resolved strikes in the IBEW's jurisdiction in the construction industry.

In September 1941, the National Apprenticeship Standards for the Electrical Construction Industry, a joint effort among the IBEW, the National Electrical Contractors Association, and the Federal Committee on Apprenticeship, were established. The IBEW added additional training programs and courses as needed to keep up with new technologies, including an industrial electronics course in 1959 and an industrial nuclear power course in 1966.

The IBEW's membership peaked in 1972 at approximately 1 million members. The membership numbers were in a slow decline throughout the rest of the 1970s and the 1980s, but have since stabilized. One major loss of membership for the IBEW came about because of the court-ordered breakup at the end of 1982 of AT&T, where the IBEW was heavily organized among both telephone workers and in AT&T's manufacturing facilities. In 1988, 30 percent of American construction work was unionized while the IBEW had 40 percent of electrical-related construction. As of 2026, the union reports having 901,000 members.

The IBEW supports new construction of nuclear power plants in the United States. It also supports new construction of data centers.

== Leadership ==
=== International presidents ===
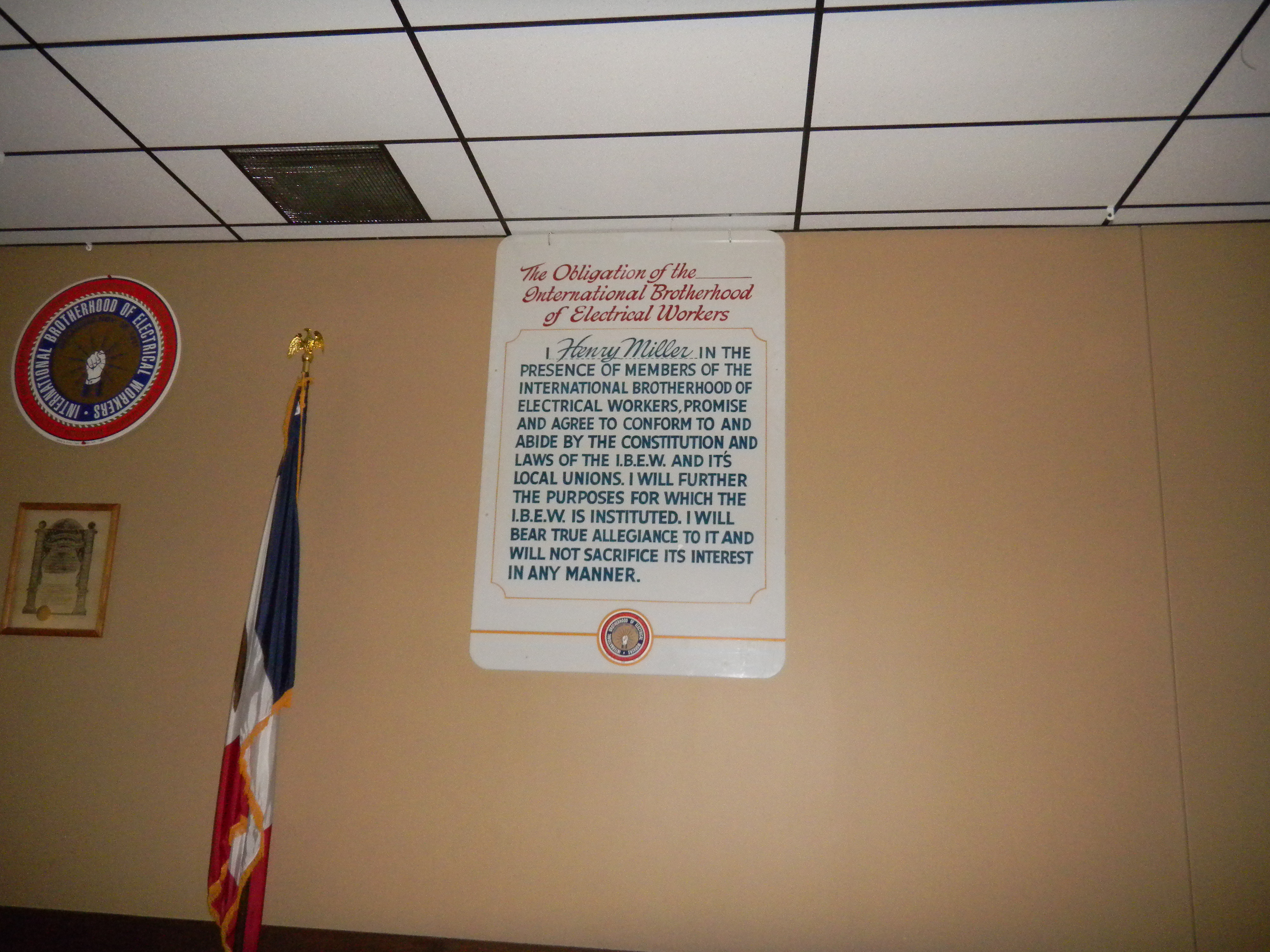
IBEW obligation at Local 405 hall in Cedar Rapids, Iowa

- Henry Miller (1891–1893)
- Queren Jansen (1893–1894)
- H. W. Sherman (1894–1897)
- J. H. Maloney (1897–1899)
- Thomas Wheeler (1899–1901)
- W. A. Jackson (1901–1903)
- Frank Joseph McNulty (1903–1919) – first full-time, paid president of the union; elected at Salt Lake City Conference in 1903, retired at New Orleans Conference in 1919
- James Patrick Noonan (acting president, 1917, president 1919–1929) – died in office
- Henry H. Broach (1929–1933)
- Daniel W. Tracy (1933–1940)
- Edward J. Brown (1940–1947)
- Daniel W. Tracy (1947–1954)
- J. Scott Milne (1954–1955)
- Gordon M. Freeman (1955–1968)
- Charles H. Pillard (1968–1986)
- John Joseph (Jack) Barry (1986–2001)
- Edwin D. (Ed) Hill (2001–2015)
- Lonnie R. Stephenson (2015–2023)
- Kenneth W. Cooper (since 2023)

=== International secretary-treasurers ===
1891: James T. Kelly
1897: H. W. Sherman
1905: Peter W. Collins
1912: Charles P. Ford
1925: Gustave M. Bugniazet
1947: J. Scott Milne
1954: Joseph D. Keenan
1976: Ralph A. Legion
1985: Jack F. Moore
1997: Edwin D. Hill
2001: Jeremiah J. O'Connor
2005: Jon F. Walters
2008: Lindell K. Lee
2011: Sam Chilia
2017: Kenneth W. Cooper
2023: Paul A. Noble

== See also ==
- IBEW Building
- Henry Miller Museum
