= Charles H. Pillard =

American labor union leader

Charles H. Pillard (October 26, 1918 – April 26, 1999) was an American labor union leader.

Born in Buffalo, New York, Pillard worked as an electrician, and joined the International Brotherhood of Electrical Workers (IBEW). During World War II, he served in the United States Army, and was promoted to captain, and awarded the Bronze Star. After the war, he soon began working for the union, becoming business manager of his local, then president of the New York State Federation of Electrical Workers, and a member of the IBEW's executive council. He also served as director of a technical school in New York City.

In 1968, Pillard was elected as president of IBEW, in which role he increased its membership to more than one million workers. The union successfully sued the Nixon administration over federal wage controls that disadvantaged the working poor, and won a case against Westinghouse which granted the union access to information on its treatment of women and minority groups. In 1986, IBEW members kept working at AT&T factories while members of the Communication Workers of America were on strike, something which led to a dispute between the unions. In its aftermath, Pillard retired.

Pillard served on a large number of committees, including as a vice-president of the AFL-CIO, and as vice-chair of the President's Committee on the Employment of the Handicapped.

Trade union offices
Preceded by Gordon M. Freeman	President of the International Brotherhood of Electrical Workers; 1968–1986	Succeeded by John J. Barry
