= Ed Hill (comedian) =

Canadian stand-up comedian

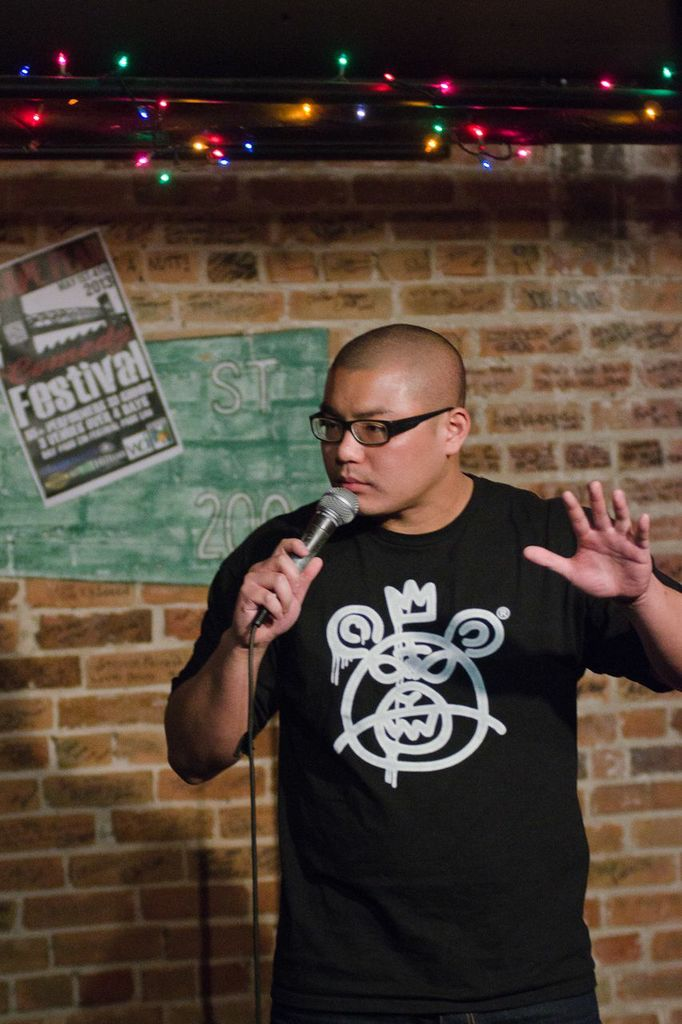
- Hill at Cape Fear Comedy Festival
- Born: 1984 (age 41–42); Taipei, Taiwan

Comedy career
- Years active: 2009–present
- Medium: Live performance, television, radio
- Genres: Observational comedy, satire
- Subjects: Everyday life, human behaviour, multiculturalism, social interaction, Asian culture
- Website: http://www.kingedhill.com

Ed Hill (born 1984) is a Canadian stand-up comedian and podcaster. He began performing in Vancouver, British Columbia and regularly tours North America and Asia. He currently resides in Vancouver.

== Early life ==
Hill is of Taiwanese descent. His parents immigrated from Taiwan to Vancouver when he was ten years old. Hill holds a master's degree from Simon Fraser University and an undergraduate degree from the University of British Columbia. Hill also holds a performance degree in concert piano and worked as a professional Disk Jockey prior to stand up comedy.

== Career ==
Hill is a touring performer and has been featured in various national and international comedy festivals. He was voted by Westender Magazine in Vancouver, British Columbia as "Best Comedian" in 2016 and 2015 and "Best Local Stand Up 2015 Runner-Up" by The Georgia Straight. He has also appeared on Season 5 of Gotham Comedy Live on AXS TV, Season 1 of Up Late Northwest on KING-TV, Bite TV's Stand Up & Bite Me, Comedy Time TV, CBC Radio, and Sirius XM's Satellite Radio. His performances have also garnered notable media attention throughout Canada, the United States, and Asia.

In 2018, Hill was noted by Reader's Digest Magazine as one of "22 Canadian Comedians to Watch Out For". In 2015, Hill was featured on the cover of Canadian Immigrant Magazine as "Comic to Watch".

In 2021, Hill became the first stand up comedian of Taiwanese-Canadian descent to release a one hour comedy special titled "Candy & Smiley", named after his parents. The special is distributed worldwide by Comedy Dynamics, a Nacelle Company in 2021. The special was named top 15 stand-up comedy special of 2021 by Paste Magazine and best of 2021 by NPR Radio.

In 2023, Hill made his off-off Broadway debut with his one man show "Stupid Ed" at the Tank Theater in New York City. In 2024, Hill's released his final comedy special, "Stupid Ed", titled after his live off-off Broadway show and distributed by Comedy Dynamics, a Nacelle Company. The special was filmed inside a mental health clinic in front of an audience of one.

== Other work ==
Ed is the creator and host of the Son of Smiley Podcast, which is titled after Ed's father, Smiley. Hill hosts weekly episodes ranging from 10 to 15 minutes focusing on a short story from his childhood. The show concluded in January 2023. Ed is also the co-host of the "Model Mythology" Podcast, which is a podcast that explores and uplifts all Asian voices as a way to combat the Model Minority Myth. As co-creator of the Ex is Forever podcast, Hill hosts biweekly episodes alongside fellow comedian Jeff Penner. The 30- to 40-minute episodes, which are accessible through iTunes, focus on the past relationship of an invited guest, allowing them to explore both the positive and negative aspects of their breakup. The show went on hiatus in 2014 after 21 episodes.

== Personal life ==
Hill's website and social media names often begins with "King Ed". Hill explained he selected this name due to a street in Vancouver named "King Edward" and he does not have any royal affiliation.

== Discography ==
- 2013: Canasian (CD)
- 2016: Weirdo Whisperer (CD)
- 2019: Son of Smiley (CD)

== Filmography ==
- 2021: Candy & Smiley (Comedy Special)
- 2022: Love at the Mix (Comedy Special)
- 2024: Stupid Ed (Comedy Special)
