= Edward Hill (Mississippi politician) =

American politician and postmaster

Edward Hill was an American politician and postmaster in Mississippi during the Reconstruction era. He was the first Black person to hold a federal office in the area he lived in, and the Davenport Morning Star newspaper called him a "leader of Republican politics in Mississippi." After he retired as postmaster, it took around 27 years before another Black person held a federal office in the area.

== Career ==
Hill began working as a politician around 1867. On May 3, 1869, after Reconstruction laws went into effect, Hill was appointed to the Board of Supervisors in Hinds County, Mississippi, assigned to the Raymond District. According to the Mississippi Historical Society, the Board of Supervisors during this time held "more importance to the county than... any other officials." Hill continued to be a Supervisor until at least 1871.

On June 6, 1870, Hill became the postmaster of the Raymond post office in Mississippi, working in the position until 1874. In May 1874, Margaret "Maggie" Pierson took over as postmaster. After Hill left the position, only white people held federal positions in Raymond, up until 1901, when George C. Granberry was appointed as postmaster.

== Personal life and death ==
Hill was married to Alice Hill. Before the American Civil War, he was said to have owned slaves. According to the Davenport Morning Star, he did not know how to read or write.

Hill died in late May or early June in 1885. His wife survived him, dying in 1890.
