= National Apprenticeship Act =

The National Apprenticeship Act (also known as the Fitzgerald Act) is a federal law in the United States which regulates apprenticeship and on-the-job training programs.

Apprentice programs in the U.S. were largely unregulated until 1934. After passage of the National Industrial Recovery Act (NIRA), industry, trade unions and the National Recovery Administration cooperated to fashion various "industry codes" to govern competition, wages, working conditions and quality of products and services. One aspect of the general construction industry code was a set of rules regulating apprenticeship programs in the construction industry.

The NIRA was declared unconstitutional by the United States Supreme Court in May 1935.

To continue the work for the construction industry code authority in regard to apprenticeship programs, United States Secretary of Labor Frances Perkins established the Federal Committee on Apprenticeship. Composed of representatives from federal government agencies, Perkins tasked the committee to recommend federal policies regarding apprenticeships.

In 1937, the Congress passed the National Apprenticeship Act (29 U.S.C. 50), also known as "the Fitzgerald Act." The Act established a national advisory committee whose task was to research and draft regulations to establish minimum standards for apprenticeship programs. The Act was later amended to permit the United States Department of Labor to issue regulations protecting the health, safety and general welfare of apprentices, and to encourage the use of contracts in the hiring and employment of them.

The Fitzgerald Act is administered by the Employment and Training Administration in the Department of Labor. The standards governing apprenticeship programs are located in the U.S. Code of Federal Regulations at Title 29, CFR Part 29. Regulations banning racial, ethnic, religious, age and gender discrimination in apprenticeship programs are located at Title 29, CFR Part 30.
