= John J. Barry =

American trial lawyer (1940-2000)

John Joseph Barry (April 4, 1940 – April 9, 2000) was an American trial lawyer and former Assistant United States Attorney.

== Early life ==
His father was James J. Barry of New York. Barry graduated from the Pratt Institute and New York University School of Law.

== Career ==
In 1973, as Assistant United States Attorney, he testified for the prosecution in the Camden 28 case that resulted in acquittal by jury nullification.

He was a partner in the law firm of Tompkins, McGuire, Wachenfeld & Barry in Newark, New Jersey. Among his clients were his brother-in-law Donald Trump and electronics retail executifive "Crazy" Eddie Antar, who was accused of fraud in 1986.

== Personal life ==
He was married to Judge Maryanne Trump Barry in 1982, with whom he had one daughter and one stepson. Through her, he was brother-in-law to Donald Trump, the 45th and 47th President of the United States. He died of cancer on April 9, 2000.
