= Edwin D. Hill =

American labor union leader (1937–2018)

17th International President of the International Brotherhood of Electrical Workers
- In office 2001–2015
- Preceded by: Jack_Barry_(unionist)
- Succeeded by: Lonnie R. Stephenson

2nd International Secretary-Treasurer of the International Brotherhood of Electrical Workers
- In office 1998–2001
- Preceded by: James T. Kelly (office abolished from 1895 to 1998)
- Succeeded by: Jeremiah J. O'Connor

10th International Secretary of the International Brotherhood of Electrical Workers
- In office 1997–1998
- Preceded by: Jack F. Moore
- Succeeded by: office abolished

Personal details
- Born: August 11, 1937 Center Township, Beaver County, Pennsylvania
- Died: December 1, 2018 (aged 81)
- Education: Pennsylvania State University; Indiana University of Pennsylvania; National Labor College

Edwin D. "Ed" Hill (August 11, 1937 – December 1, 2018) was an electrical worker, labor union activist and labor leader in the United States. He was the president of the International Brotherhood of Electrical Workers (IBEW), AFL-CIO from 2001 until his retirement in 2015.

== Early life and local union career ==
Hill was born in Center Township, Beaver County, Pennsylvania, and graduated from Freedom High School in Freedom, Pennsylvania. He took courses at Penn State University and Indiana University of Pennsylvania, but did not matriculate.

In 1956, Hill joined IBEW Local 712 in Beaver, Pennsylvania as a journeyman wireman, graduating from the apprenticeship program in 1960. Becoming active in his local union, Hill was elected to the union's political action committee in 1961. In 1964, Hill was elected vice president of the local, eventually becoming president. He was elected the local's business manager in 1970.

During this time, Hill married his wife, Rosemary, and they had three children.

While serving as the union's business manager, Hill became active in larger labor movement issues. He was elected treasurer, then vice president and Committee on Political Education (COPE, the union's political action committee) chairman. He resigned in 1978. Hill was also elected president of the Beaver County Central Labor Council (CLC) in 1972, serving until 1977. In 1976, Hill was elected a vice president of the Pennsylvania AFL-CIO. This position forced him to retire from his positions with the building trades council and CLC. He remained with the Pennsylvania AFL-CIO until 1997.

In 1982, IBEW president Charles Pillard appointed Hill to be an international representative with the national union. During his time with the international union, Hill completed a number of labor courses at Pennsylvania State University and at the National Labor College.

In 1992, Hill was appointed Third District Office International Representative. He served in that position until 1994, when he was named Third District Vice President, overseeing union activities in Pennsylvania, New York, New Jersey and Delaware.

== Appointment as international secretary ==
In March 1997, IBEW international secretary Jack F. Moore announced his retirement, effective April 1, 1997. IBEW President John Joseph "Jack" Barry appointed Hill to be secretary to fill Moore's unexpired term. The IBEW's executive council then confirmed his appointment. As secretary, Hill also was chair of the IBEW Committee on Political Education, and a trustee to the National Electrical Benefit Fund and the IBEW pension benefit fund.

In 1998, the IBEW membership, meeting in convention, voted to alter the IBEW constitution and combine that office of secretary with the office of treasurer. Hill now assumed the duties of both offices. Delegates also changed the constitution to require voting for president by secret ballot.

Hill was an activist secretary-treasurer. He streamlined the union's accounting systems and updated its record-keeping and membership databases. He also oversaw an expansion of the union's training programs, and worked with Barry to pour new resources into organizing. Hill also built up the union's political action fund, and began its first grassroots member mobilization efforts. As a trustee, Hill also worked to improve the performance of the union's benefit and pension funds. Almost as soon as he took office as trustee, he fired three managers of the $6.8 billion IBEW-National Electrical Contractors Association pension fund. The three had been part of the fund's investment staff, which had been established only a few years earlier.

== Presidency ==
In 2000, Barry, then 76 and ailing, announced he would not seek re-election as president of the IBEW. Hill was appointed President on January 29, 2001 and easily won reelection to a 5-year term at the International convention, in September of that year. Jeremiah J. O'Connor, his running mate, was elected secretary-treasurer. It was the first presidential election in IBEW history which utilized the secret ballot.

Hill was a strong and public backer of AFL-CIO president John Sweeney. During Sweeney's difficult re-election bid in 2005, Hill was a prominent Sweeney organizer and spokesman.

In 2011, International Brotherhood of Electrical Workers President Edwin D. Hill was named the newest member of the AIL/NILICO Labor Advisory Board.

On May 22, 2015, in a brief statement, Hill announced his retirement, effective June 1, 2015, recommending that I.B.E.W. 6th District vice-president be appointed to succeed him. This recommendation was swiftly approved by the I.B.E.W. International Executive Board. Hill died on December 1, 2018, at the age of 81.

== Notes ==
Trade union offices
Preceded by Jack Berry	International President, IBEW; 2001–2015	Succeeded by Lonnie R. Stephenson
